= HMS Wallace =

Destroyer of the Royal Navy

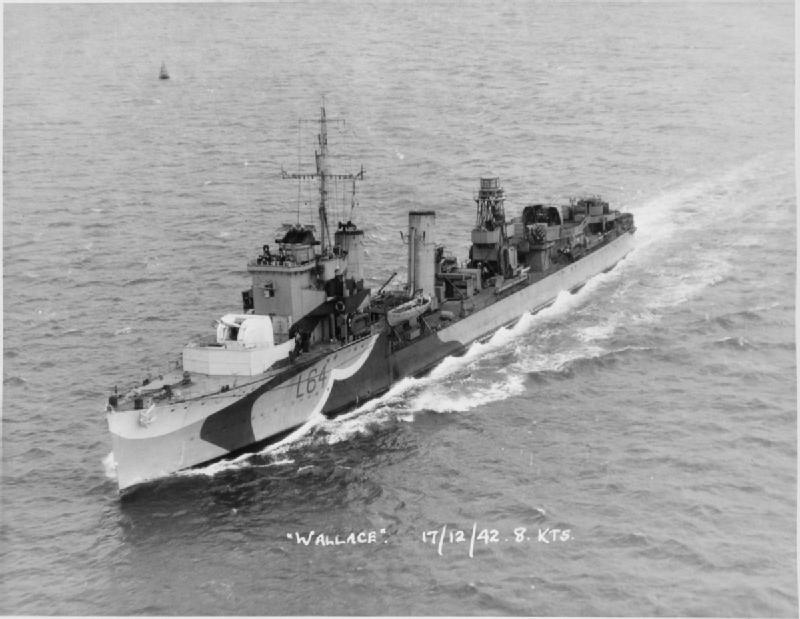
- HMS Wallace in 1942

History

United Kingdom
- Name: HMS Wallace
- Ordered: April 1917
- Builder: John I. Thornycroft & Company
- Laid down: 15 August 1917
- Launched: 26 October 1918
- Commissioned: 14 February 1919
- Fate: Scrapped, late 1945

General characteristics
- Class & type: Thornycroft type destroyer leader
- Displacement: 1,554 long tons (1,579 t) (standard); 2,009 long tons (2,041 t) (full load)
- Length: 329 ft (100 m) o/a; 318 ft 3 in (97.00 m) pp
- Beam: 31 ft 6 in (9.60 m)
- Draught: 12 ft 3 in (3.73 m)
- Installed power: 40,000 shp (30,000 kW)
- Propulsion: 2 × Brown-Curtiss single reduction steam turbines; 4 × Yarrow boilers; 2 × shafts
- Speed: 36.5 kn (42.0 mph; 67.6 km/h)
- Capacity: 500 short tons (450 t) fuel oil
- Complement: 164
- Armament: 5 × BL 4.7 in (120 mm) Mark I dual purpose gun, 1 × QF 3 inch 20 cwt anti-aircraft gun, 6 × 21 inch (533 mm) torpedo tubes (2 × 3)

HMS Wallace was a Thornycroft type flotilla leader of the British Royal Navy. Built by J I Thornycroft during the First World War, Wallace was launched on 26 October 1918, and completed in February 1919, after the end of the war.

Wallace served mainly with the Atlantic Fleet between the wars, although she was deployed to the Baltic in 1919 as part of the British campaign in the Baltic during the Russian Civil War, and to the Eastern Mediterranean during the Chanak Crisis in 1922–23.

The ship was converted to a fast escort in 1938–1939, with her existing armament being removed and replaced with a more modern anti-aircraft and anti-ship armament. During the Second World War, Wallace was mainly employed in escorting convoys on the East coast of Great Britain, although these duties were interrupted to take part in Operation Husky, the Anglo-American invasion of Sicily in 1943. Wallace was placed in reserve in 1945 before being scrapped later that year.

== Design and construction ==
The Thornycroft type or Shakespeare-class leaders, were like the similar and contemporary Admiralty type (also known as the Scott-class) were designed to meet a requirement from Admiral Sir John Jellicoe, commander of the Grand Fleet, for a large, fast and heavily armed flotilla leader to match and outclass rumoured large German destroyers.

The ships had a length of 329 ft 1 in (100.30 m) overall, 325 feet 3 inches (99.14 m) at the waterline and 318 ft 3 in (97.00 m) between perpendiculars, with a beam of 31 ft 6 in (9.60 m) and a draught of 12 ft 6 in (3.81 m). Design displacement was 1,530 long tons (1,550 t) normal and 1,900 long tons (1,900 t) full load. (Note: Conway's gives a legend displacement of 1,554 long tons (1,579 t) and a full load displacement of 2,009 long tons (2,041 t), while Lenton gives a normal displacement of 1,480 long tons (1,500 t) and a full load displacement of 2,080 long tons (2,110 t).) The ship's machinery consisted of four Yarrow boilers that fed steam at 250 pounds per square inch (1,700 kPa) to two sets of Brown-Curtis single-reduction geared-steam turbines, rated at 40,000 shaft horsepower (30,000 kW). This gave a design speed of 36.5 kn (42.0 mph; 67.6 km/h) light, which corresponded to about 32.5 kn (37.4 mph; 60.2 km/h) at full load. She reached a speed of 37.72 kn (43.41 mph; 69.86 km/h) during sea trials. Up to 500 tons of oil fuel could be carried, giving a range of 5,000 nautical miles (9,300 km; 5,800 mi) at 15 knots (28 km/h; 17 mph).

The class had a main gun armament consisted of five 4.7 in (120 mm)/45 calibre BL Mark I guns, (Note: In British practice, BL (Breech Loading) indicated that a separate, bagged, charge was used.) on CP VI mountings capable of elevating to 30 degrees, arranged in two superfiring pairs fore and aft of the superstructure with the remaining gun positioned on a platform between the funnels. Anti-aircraft armament consisted of a single 3 in (76 mm) gun on a platform abaft the rear funnel. Torpedo armament consisted of two triple mounts for 21-inch (533 mm) torpedo tubes between the 3-inch AA gun and the rear pair of 4.7-inch guns. Four depth charges were carried.

Wallace, named for William Wallace, was ordered in April 1917 as a follow on to two ships (Shakespeare and Spenser) ordered in April 1916. Four more were ordered in April 1918. Wallace was laid down at Thornycroft's Woolston, Hampshire shipyard on 15 August 1917, was launched on 26 October 1918 and commissioned on 14 February 1919.

=== Conversion and subsequent modifications ===
In 1936, the Admiralty recognised that the Royal Navy had a shortage of escort ships with good anti-aircraft armament, suitable for operations along the East coast of the Great Britain. As well as building a new class of escort destroyers designed for this role (the Hunt-class escort destroyers), it was decided to convert a number of old destroyers of the V and W-classes, now obsolete as fleet destroyers, to perform a similar role, with the similarly elderly but larger Wallace undergoing an equivalent conversion. This programme became known as the "Wair" conversions. The conversion involved the removal of the ship's armament and replacement with an entirely new anti-aircraft and anti-submarine armament. Two twin QF 4 inch Mk XVI naval gun anti-aircraft mounts were fitted, with a modern fire control system, mounted on top of a new enclosed steel bridge that replaced the old forward superstructure, to direct their fire. The larger size of Wallace compared to the V and W class destroyers, allowed a quadruple 2-pounder (40 mm) "pom-pom" close-range anti-aircraft mount to be fitted right aft, uniquely for a "Wair" conversion. The location of this mount, covering the aft quarter of the ship where air attack was more likely, was more effective than the amidships location used by more modern fleet destroyers, where the ship's superstructure masked the aft-wards field of fire. Anti-aircraft armament was completed by two quadruple Vickers .50 machine gun mounts amidships where the torpedo tubes were previously mounted, with the forward mount on the port side and the aft mount to starboard. Modern sonar, and a relatively powerful depth-charge outfit of 30 depth charges provided the ship's anti-submarine equipment. No torpedo tubes were fitted. The ship's crew increased to 187 officers and men.

Wallace underwent a "Wair" conversion at Devonport Dockyard between September 1938 and June 1939. By late 1942, close-in anti-aircraft armament had been enhanced by the addition of two Oerlikon 20 mm cannon, while Type 272 surface search radar was mounted on a short lattice tower aft, while Type 291 air warning radar was mounted at the top of the foremast, and Type 285 gunnery control radar was fitted to the anti-aircraft director. The quadruple .50 machine guns were later (by mid 1944) replaced by two single 2-pounder pom-poms, while two more single Oerlikon 20 mm guns were added.

== Service ==
=== Between the wars ===
After trials, Wallace joined the 1st Destroyer Flotilla as leader and flagship of the Flotilla's Captain (D). In late May 1919, Wallace led the 1st Flotilla when it deployed to the Baltic Sea as part of the British operations in the Baltic during the Russian Civil War. On 31 May 1919, Wallace was lying off Seskar in the Gulf of Finland, with the cruisers Cleopatra, Dragon and Galatea, and the destroyers Voyager, Vanessa, Wryneck, Versatile and Vivacious when the destroyer Walker, which was on patrol at the edge of the Russian defensive minefield, came under attack by the Russian destroyer Azard, supported by the battleship Petropavlovsk. The British force set out in support of Walker, which was hit twice by shells from Petropavlovsk, but the Russians withdrew behind a minefield before a more general engagement could occur. The 1st Flotilla was relieved from Baltic duties by the 2nd Destroyer Flotilla in August 1919, but Wallace returned again in November with the ships of the 1st Flotilla, although men aboard many of the ships of the Flotilla mutinied on hearing that they were to return to the Baltic so soon after having served there, deserting from their ships, with the flotilla's crews made up to strength from men from the battleships of the fleet. The 1st Flotilla left the Baltic at the end of December 1919.

Wallace was deployed to Irish waters in May 1920, as the Irish War of Independence continued. In 1921, the Royal Navy's destroyer forces were reorganised, with smaller flotillas of eight destroyers and a leader replacing the previous large flotillas, which had proved to be difficult to handle, with Wallace remaining leader of the new, smaller 1st Destroyer Flotilla. In September 1922, the Chanak Crisis threatened war between Britain and Turkey as Turkish forces under Mustafa Kemal seemed likely to advance into allied-occupied Constantinople and to cross the Bosporus into Eastern Thrace. The Royal Navy forces in the region were reinforced from British waters as war became more likely. The 1st Destroyer Flotilla, including Wallace, was part of these re-enforcements, arriving at Chanack (now Çanakkale) on 4 October. Diplomatic measures avoided the outbreak of war, and Wallace was back in British waters by May 1923. Wallace took part in a Fleet Review at Spithead of the Atlantic Fleet by Dominion leaders on 3 November 1923. Wallace was refitted at Portsmouth from June to November 1924.

In May 1925, the 1st Destroyer Flotilla was renamed the 5th Destroyer Flotilla, with Wallace remaining leader of the new flotilla. Wallace continued in service with the 5th Flotilla until July 1934, interrupted by refits in June–November 1926 (when her high-speed turbines were repaired) and from December 1931 to June 1932 (when her boilers were retubed). Wallace then entered the Maintained Reserve at Portsmouth.

=== Second World War ===
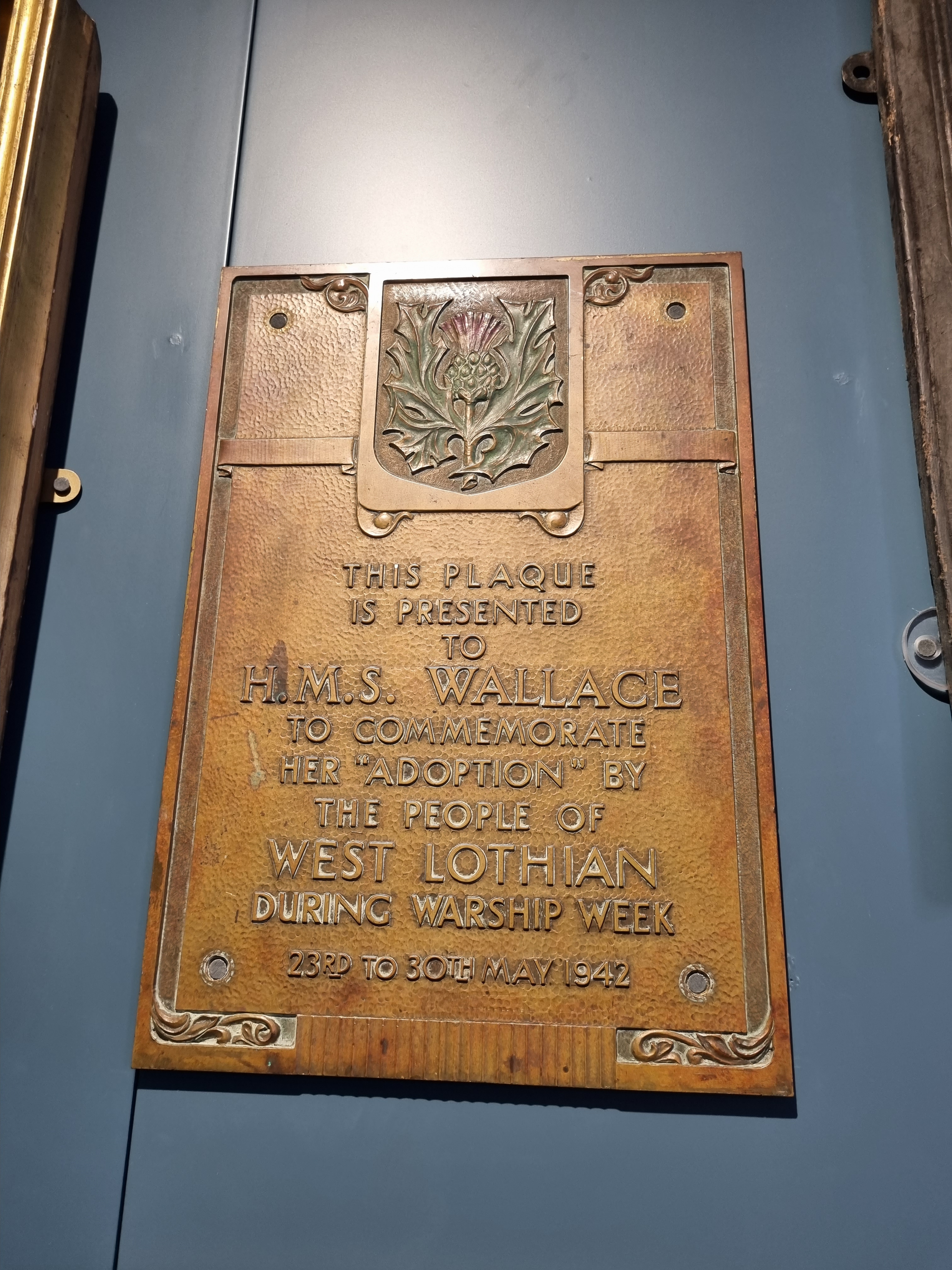
Plaque presented to Wallace to commemorate her adoption by the people of West Lothian, now in the Linlithgow museum

Wallace started her conversion to a "Wair"-type anti-aircraft escort in September 1938, with the work being carried out in conjunction with programmed major repairs. She carried out trials on 22 May 1939, and completed the conversion on 14 June that year. On commissioning, she was used for training the Royal Navy Volunteer Reserve at Liverpool, but the threat of war resulted in these duties being suspended, and Wallace arrived at her war station at Rosyth on 31 August 1939. Wallace was employed in escorting convoys along the east coast of Britain for most of the war. On 13 September 1939, Wallace collided with the merchant ship Redriff off Lowestoft. Wallace was badly damaged, with a 3 ft (0.91 m) hole under the waterline, and thought to be in danger of sinking, with the destroyer Wanderer assisting Wallace until she could be taken into Harwich. Wallace was under repair at Hull from 21 September to 22 October that year. On the night of 12/13 December, the German destroyers Hermann Künne, Friedrich Ihn, Erich Steinbrinck, Richard Beitzen and Bruno Heinemann laid a minefield off the Tyne estuary. The steamer Amble struck a mine from this field on 16 December, and Wallace rescued 17 of Amble's crew.

On 27 February 1940, the French steamer PLM 25 struck two mines in a minefield laid off the Cromer Knoll lightvessel by the German destroyers Bruno Heinemann, Wolfgang Zenker and Erich Koellner on the night of 9/10 February. Wallace rescued the survivors. On 1 March, Wallace and the Naval trawler Cape Argona rescued survivors from the Italian merchant ship Mirella, which had been torpedoed by the German submarine U-20, while the next day, Wallace and the trawler Stella Carino rescued survivors from the steamer Albano, which had struck a mine.

In June–July 1941, Wallace was refitted, with radar fitted. In May 1942, the ship was adopted by West Lothian during Warship Week.

On 22 February 1942, Wallace was slightly damaged in a collision with the merchant ship SS Fulham VI. On the night of 31 March, ten Norwegian merchant ships that were trapped in Swedish ports set out from Gothenburg in an attempt to escape to Britain via the Kattegat and Skagerrak, while evading German forces. Wallace was one of six destroyers sent to rendezvous with the merchant ships. Only two of the Norwegian ships made it, however, the tankers B. P. Newton and Lind reached Britain. Six ships were sunk by the Germans or scuttled to avoid capture by the Germans, while the remaining two ships returned to Gothenburg. On 16 May 1942, Wallace was damaged by German bombers, and had to be towed into Sheerness by the corvette Guillemot. Wallace was under repair at the East India Docks in London until the end of July that year. In June 1942, Prince Philip, later Duke of Edinburgh was appointed as sub-lieutenant on the destroyer while Wallace was involved in convoy escort tasks on the east coast of Britain.

In June 1943, Wallace was detached from East coast convoy duties to take part in Operation Husky, the Allied invasion of Sicily. She escorted the assault Convoy KMF 18, carrying the First Canadian Division from Bône in Algeria to the "Bark West" landing beaches near Pachino, and provided anti-aircraft cover for the landings on 10 July. In October, Prince Philip became first lieutenant of Wallace. During the invasion of Sicily, in July 1943, Philip was second in command of Wallace. The ship was attacked at night by German aircraft, which would return to finish off the damaged ship; it was saved by Philip's devising a plan to launch a raft with smoke floats that successfully decoyed the bombers, allowing the ship to slip away unnoticed.

After Operation Husky, Wallace returned to her East coast convoy duties, although she increasingly suffered mechanical problems. On 16 March 1945, Wallace collided with the destroyer Farndale, and was not repaired. She was placed in Category C reserve on 12 April 1945 before being sold for scrap, and was broken up by Clayton & Davie on the Tyne.

== Pennant numbers ==
Pennant number	From	To
D3A	February 1919	November 1919
D20	November 1919	1939
L64	1939	1945
