= Humphrey Walwyn =

British Naval officer and Governor of Newfoundland

Vice-Admiral Sir Humphrey Walwyn KCSI KCMG CB DSO
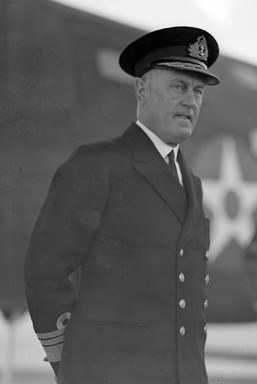

67th Governor of Newfoundland
- In office 1936–1946
- Preceded by: David Murray Anderson
- Succeeded by: Gordon Macdonald

Personal details
- Born: 25 January 1879 Gresford, Denbighshire, Wales, UK
- Died: 29 December 1957 (aged 78) Maiden Newton, Dorset, England, UK
- Spouse: Eileen Mary van Straubenzee (later Dame Eileen Walwyn)
- Children: 1 child (Rear Admiral James Humphrey Walwyn, CB)
- Profession: Naval officer Governor

Military service
- Allegiance: United Kingdom; British India
- Branch/service: Royal Navy; Royal Indian Navy
- Years of service: 1893–1934
- Rank: Vice-Admiral
- Commands: Royal Indian Marine; HMS Valiant; HMS Queen Elizabeth; 7th Destroyer Flotilla; 2nd Destroyer Flotilla; HMS Spenser; HMS Gibraltar
- Battles/wars: Second Boer War; First World War: Battle of Jutland
- Awards: Knight Commander of the Order of the Star of India; Knight Commander of the Order of St Michael and St George; Companion of the Order of the Bath; Distinguished Service Order; Order of St. Stanislas, 2nd Class with Swords (Russia)

Viceregal styles of Sir Humphrey Thomas Walwyn
- Reference style: His Excellency
- Spoken style: Your Excellency

Vice-Admiral Sir Humphrey Thomas Walwyn, KCSI, KCMG, CB, DSO (25 January 1879 – 29 December 1957) was an officer of the Royal Navy, who served during the Second Boer War and First World War, and was the Commander-in-Chief of the Royal Indian Navy from 1928 until his retirement in 1934. He then served as Governor of Newfoundland from 1936, throughout the Second World War, until 1946.

== Naval career ==
Walwyn joined the Royal Navy in 1893, spending two years training in the training ship Britannia before joining the battleship Camperdown. He served as acting sub-lieutenant from December 1898, and was confirmed in this rank on 7 February 1900, when he was posted to the pre-dreadnought battleship HMS Illustrious, serving in the Mediterranean Fleet. Later that year he was promoted to lieutenant on 15 December 1900, seeing action in the Second Boer War.

In 1902 Walwyn was posted to Excellent, the Naval Gunnery School at Whale Island, Hampshire, to train as a Gunnery Lieutenant. Upon qualifying he was appointed to the school's staff for six months. From 1905 he served as Gunnery Lieutenant in the cruiser Drake and the battleships Superb and Neptune. He also spent 18 months on the staff of the Inspector of Target Practice at the Admiralty. He was promoted to the rank of commander on 1 July 1912.

Walwyn was then appointed an Assistant to the Director of Naval Ordnance at the Admiralty, remaining in that post into the first year of the First World War, finally returning to sea duty in 1915 as Commander (Second-in-Command) of the new battleship Warspite. There he saw action in the Battle of Jutland on 31 May – 1 June 1916, and was subsequently awarded the Distinguished Service Order on 15 September. He was promoted to captain on 31 December 1916, and in June 1917, was awarded the Order of St. Stanislas, 2nd Class (with Swords) by Russia.

Walwyn was appointed commander of the first class protected cruiser Gibraltar on 17 January 1919, and, from 29 April 1920, he commanded the destroyer leader Spenser, also serving as Captain (D), 2nd Destroyer Flotilla. From 1922 he served as Captain (D), 7th Destroyer Flotilla, and as Senior Officer, Mediterranean Destroyers, before returning to the Admiralty in 1924 to serve as Director of the Gunnery Division. He took command of the battleship Queen Elizabeth in March 1926, until she started a refit later that year. Soon after, he took command of Valiant, remaining with her until March 1927.

On 29 February 1928 he was promoted to rear admiral. He was appointed a Companion of the Order of the Bath (CB) in the 1928 Birthday Honours.

The same year Walwyn was appointed Flag Officer Commanding and Director of the Royal Indian Marine, receiving promotion to vice admiral on 1 November 1932, and in the 1933 New Year Honours was made a Knight Commander of the Order of the Star of India (KCSI). He oversaw the change of the Royal Indian Marine to the Royal Indian Navy in October 1934, of which he was the first Flag Officer Commanding, but retired in November 1934 after only a month. He was placed on the Retired List on 15 December 1934.

== Governor of Newfoundland ==
From 1936 Walwyn served as Governor of Newfoundland and chairman of the Commission of Government. In the 1939 Birthday Honours he was appointed a Knight Commander of the Order of St. Michael and St. George (KCMG). During the Second World War he was active in encouraging Newfoundlanders to join the war effort. In 1941, he attended the Atlantic Conference with Franklin D. Roosevelt and Winston Churchill. In 1946, he retired to Maiden Newton, Dorset, where he died in 1957.

== Family ==
In recognition of her public and philanthropic work for the community in Newfoundland, his wife, Lady Eileen Mary Walwyn (1883–1973), the daughter of Major General Turner van Straubenzee, CB and Florinda Harriette van Straubenzee, was created a Dame Commander of the Order of the British Empire on 1 January 1947. Their son was Rear-Admiral James Humphrey Walwyn, R.N., C.B. (1964) O.B.E. (1944).

== See also ==
- List of people from Newfoundland and Labrador

Academic offices
Preceded by	Visitor of Memorial University of Newfoundland; 1938-1945	Succeeded by
