= HMS Scout (1918) =

Royal Navy S class destroyer

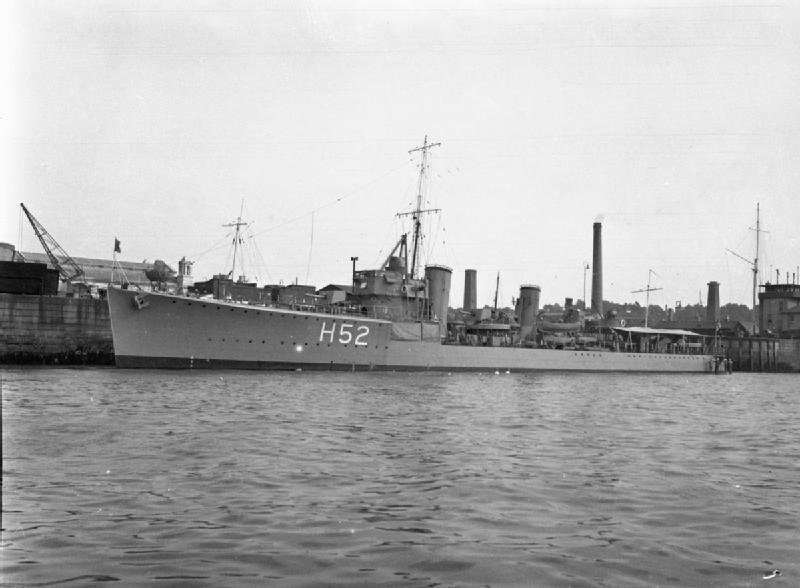
- Sister ship Scotsman in 1933

History

United Kingdom
- Name: Scout
- Ordered: 17 April 1917
- Builder: John Brown & Company, Clydebank
- Yard number: 475
- Laid down: 25 October 1917
- Launched: 27 April 1918
- Completed: 15 June 1918
- Out of service: 29 March 1946
- Fate: Sold to be broken up

General characteristics
- Class & type: S-class destroyer
- Displacement: 1,075 long tons (1,092 t) normal; 1,221 long tons (1,241 t) deep load
- Length: 265 ft (80.77 m) p.p.
- Beam: 26 ft 8 in (8.13 m)
- Draught: 9 ft 10 in (3.00 m) mean
- Propulsion: 3 Yarrow boilers; 2 geared Brown-Curtis steam turbines, 27,000 shp
- Speed: 36 knots (41 mph; 67 km/h)
- Range: 2,750 nmi (5,090 km) at 15 kn (28 km/h)
- Complement: 90
- Armament: 3 × single QF 4 in (102 mm) Mark IV guns; 1 × single 2-pdr 40 mm (2 in) Mk. II AA gun; 2 × twin 21 in (533 mm) torpedo tubes; 4 × depth charge chutes

HMS Scout was an S-class destroyer that served with the Royal Navy from the end of the First World War to the end of the Second World War. On retirement, the vessel was the oldest destroyer in the Royal Navy. The S class was a development of the previous R class, with minor differences, constructed as a cheaper and faster alternative to the V and W class. Launched in 1918, Scout joined the Grand Fleet for the last few months of the First World War before sailing in 1919 under the command of Rear-admiral Walter Cowan to participate in the British campaign in the Baltic. Scout was part of a flotilla attacked by four Russian destroyers, led by Avtroil, but sustained no damage and, on returning to the UK, was placed in reserve. The vessel participated in coastal artillery training exercises near the River Tees in 1934 and ran aground in 1938 but returned to service in the China Station before the start of the Second World War. Scout assisted in the defence of northern Sumatra after the United Kingdom declaration of war on Japan and evacuated naval personnel from Singapore after the fall of the island before being transferred to Trincomalee, Ceylon, in 1942, serving as an escort for the remainder of the war. With peace, Scout was retired and, in 1946, sold to be broken up.

== Design and development ==
Scout was one of 33 Admiralty S class destroyers ordered by the British Admiralty on 17 April 1917 as part of the Eleventh War Construction Programme. The design was a development of the R class introduced as a cheaper and faster alternative to the V and W class. Differences with the R class were minor, such as having the searchlight moved aft.

Scout had an overall length of 276 ft (84.12 m) and a length of 265 ft (80.77 m) between perpendiculars. The beam was 26 ft 8 in (8.13 m) and draught 9 ft 10 in (3.00 m). Displacement was 1,075 long tons (1,092 t) normal and 1,221 long tons (1,241 t) deep load. Three Yarrow boilers fed steam to two sets of Brown-Curtis geared steam turbines rated at 27,000 shaft horsepower (20,000 kW) and driving two shafts, giving a design speed of 36 knots (67 km/h; 41 mph) at normal loading and 32.5 knots (60 km/h; 37 mph) at deep load. Two funnels were fitted. A full load of 301 long tons (306 t) of fuel oil was carried, which gave a design range of 2,750 nautical miles (5,090 km; 3,160 mi) at 15 knots (28 km/h; 17 mph).

Armament consisted of three QF 4 in (102 mm) Mk IV guns on the ship's centreline. One was mounted raised on the forecastle, one on a platform between the funnels and one aft. The ship also mounted a single 2-pounder 40 mm (1.6 in) "pom-pom" anti-aircraft gun for air defence. Four 21 in (533 mm) torpedo tubes were carried in two twin rotating mounts aft. Four depth charge chutes were also fitted aft. Typically ten depth charges were carried. The ship was designed to mount two additional 18 in (457 mm) torpedo tubes either side of the superstructure but this required the forecastle plating to be cut away, causing excess water to come aboard at sea, so they were removed. The weight saved enabled the heavier Mark V 21-inch torpedo to be carried. Fire control included a training-only director, single Dumaresq and a Vickers range clock. The ship had a complement of 90 officers and ratings.

== Construction and career ==
Laid down on 25 October 1917 by John Brown & Company in Clydebank with the yard number 475, Scout was launched on 27 April the following year and completed on 15 June. The vessel was the twelfth with the name to serve in the Royal Navy, the first being recorded in 1577, and one of nine of the class to be built by the yard. The vessel joined the Twelfth Destroyer Flotilla of the Grand Fleet shortly before the Armistice that ended the First World War.

Although the war on the Western Front had finished, the escalating civil war in Russia continued. The United Kingdom decided to send units of the Royal Navy into the Baltic Sea to monitor the situation and to protect British interests. The fleet was also tasked with helping to help organise the evacuation of German forces from the country and supporting the Estonian War of Independence. Scout was sent as part of a detachment of ten destroyers under the command of Rear-admiral Walter Cowan in the light cruiser Caledon. The flotilla left on 25 March 1919, sailing initially to Oslo, Norway, and Copenhagen, Denmark. Remaining there until 26 April, Scout then departed for Tallinn to support the Estonian armed forces. On 14 May, the destroyer, alongside the light cruiser Cleopatra, destroyer leader Shakespeare and destroyer Walker, left the port to Narva Bay and sailed along the Gulf of Finland. There they supported the Estonian troops against the Red Army with gunfire. They also had occasional encounters with Soviet warships, but these did not lead to significant action. For example, on 17 May, the British flotilla was stationed off the island of Seskar observing the Russian fleet at Kronstadt when the dreadnought battleship Petropavlovsk was reported to have left the anchorage. As the flotilla moved in, four Russian destroyers, led by Avtroil, attacked. Returning fire, the British ships reported a hit on one of the Russian vessels. However, both sides retreated before significant damage was recorded.

At the same time, the Royal Navy was returning to a peacetime level of strength and both the number of ships and personnel needed to be reduced to save money. By October, Scout had joined the Seventh Destroyer Flotilla based at Rosyth and was placed in reserve with a reduced complement. The ship was briefly allocated to Plymouth as an emergency destroyer until replaced by Tuscan in August 1925. On 1 April 1932, after being repaired, the vessel took up a similar role at the Nore. From there, Scout undertook a visit to Southend between 9 and 13 July. On 9 August 1934, the destroyer took part in an exercise with sister ship Scimitar to test the defences of the northeast coast, including the coastal artillery defending the River Tees. Scout was relieved by Wanderer on 5 March the following year. In April 1936, Scout ceremonially carried the body of the German Ambassador, Leopold von Hoesch, from Dover to Germany after he had died of a heart attack in London. On 4 January 1938, the ship ran aground shortly after departing Sheerness Dockyard for trials but was refloated with one engine damaged and no loss of life. After being repaired, Scout was recommissioned on 20 September and dispatched to Singapore, arriving at the colony on 19 December via the Suez Canal.

Scout joined the China Station. On 12 May 1939, the destroyer was moored off the coast of Xiamen in response to Japanese aggression. Based at British Hong Kong, with the United Kingdom declaration of war on Japan on 8 December 1941, the ship sailed to Singapore. On 18 December, Scout was in command of a flotilla of small craft known as the Perak Flotilla whose task was to stop Japanese landings in northern Sumatra. The Japanese instead attacked Palembang on the south of the island on 13 February 1942. By that time, the destroyer had left the island. During the fall of Singapore, on 14 February, the destroyer left the colony carrying naval personnel, including some who had survived the sinking of Repulse, to safety. Arriving in Batavia, the ship undertook a sortie on 26 February to attack a Japanese convoy, but returned without spotting it the following day. The destroyer sailed for the navy base at Trincomalee in British Ceylon for following day. On 26 March, the ship initially formed part of Force B based at the island supporting the Revenge class battleships that constituted the core of the force. The vessel spent the rest of the war as an escort, primarily between Ceylon and India, but occasionally further afield. For example, on 8 March 1943, the vessel accompanied the troopship Monticello on a trip from Bombay to Melbourne, Australia.

After the end of the conflict, Scout was retired and sold to be broken up on 29 March 1946 by Thos. W. Ward at Briton Ferry. At the time, the vessel was the oldest destroyer in the Royal Navy.

== Pennant numbers ==
Penant numbers
Pennant number	Date
G35	June 1918
F55	January 1919
H6A	November 1919
H51	January 1922
