= HMS Shakespeare (1917) =

Destroyer of the Royal Navy

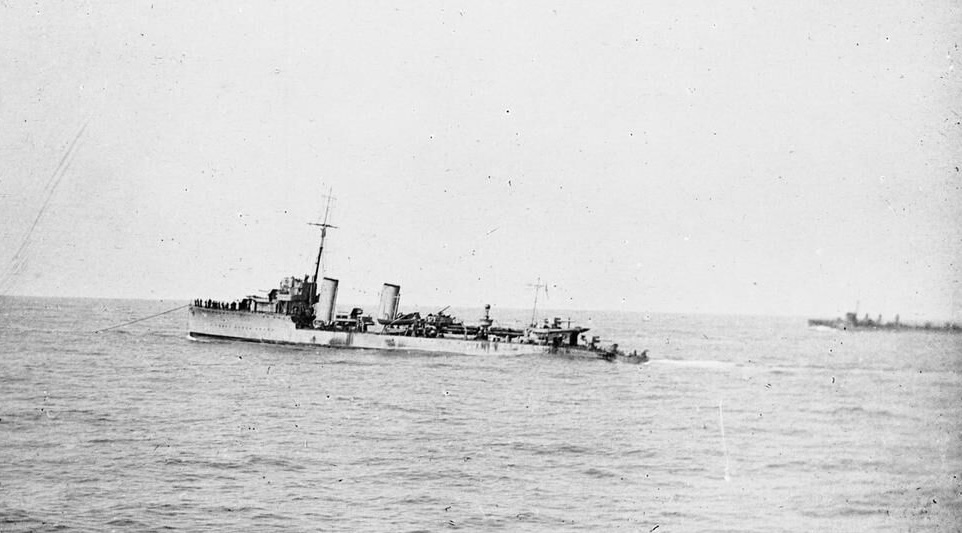
- Shakespeare under tow after mining in June 1918

History

United Kingdom
- Name: HMS Shakespeare
- Ordered: April 1916
- Builder: John I. Thornycroft & Company
- Laid down: 2 October 1916
- Launched: 7 July 1917
- Commissioned: 10 October 1917
- Fate: Sold for scrap 19 August 1936

General characteristics
- Class & type: Thornycroft type destroyer leader
- Displacement: 1,554 long tons (1,579 t) (standard); 2,009 long tons (2,041 t) (full load)
- Length: 329 ft (100 m) o/a; 318 ft 3 in (97.00 m) pp
- Beam: 31 ft 6 in (9.60 m)
- Draught: 12 ft 3 in (3.73 m)
- Installed power: 40,000 shp (30,000 kW)
- Propulsion: 2 × Brown-Curtiss single reduction steam turbines; 4 × Yarrow boilers; 2 × shafts
- Speed: 36.5 kn (42.0 mph; 67.6 km/h)
- Capacity: 500 short tons (450 t) fuel oil
- Complement: 164
- Armament: 5 × BL 4.7 in (120 mm) Mark I dual purpose gun, 1 × QF 3 inch 20 cwt anti-aircraft gun, 6 × 21 inch (533 mm) torpedo tubes (2 × 3)

HMS Shakespeare was a Thornycroft type flotilla leader of the British Royal Navy. She was built by J I Thornycroft from 1916 to 1917 as the lead ship of her class, launching in July 1917 and completing in October 1917.

Shakespeare served in the Harwich Force during the rest of the First World War, during which she survived being mined. Shakespeare served in the Baltic during the British intervention in the Russian Civil War in 1919. She went into reserve in 1925 and was sold for scrap in 1936.

== Design and construction ==
The Thornycroft type or Shakespeare-class leaders, were like the similar and contemporary Admiralty type (also known as the Scott-class) were designed to meet a requirement from Admiral Sir John Jellicoe, commander of the Grand Fleet, for a large, fast and heavily armed flotilla leader to match and outclass rumoured large German destroyers.

The ships had a length of 329 ft 1 in (100.30 m) overall, 325 feet 3 inches (99.14 m) at the waterline and 318 ft 3 in (97.00 m) between perpendiculars, with a beam of 31 ft 6 in (9.60 m) and a draught of 12 ft 6 in (3.81 m). Design displacement was 1,530 long tons (1,550 t) normal and 1,900 long tons (1,900 t) full load. (Note: Conway's gives a legend displacement of 1,554 long tons (1,579 t) and a full load displacement of 2,009 long tons (2,041 t), while Lenton gives a normal displacement of 1,480 long tons (1,500 t) and a full load displacement of 2,080 long tons (2,110 t).) The ship's machinery consisted of four Yarrow boilers that fed steam at 250 pounds per square inch (1,700 kPa) to two sets of Brown-Curtis single-reduction geared-steam turbines, rated at 40,000 shaft horsepower (30,000 kW). This gave a design speed of 36.5 kn (42.0 mph; 67.6 km/h) light, which corresponded to about 32.5 kn (37.4 mph; 60.2 km/h) at full load. During sea trials, Shakespeare's machinery generated 43,527 shp (32,458 kW) at a displacement of 1,650 long tons (1,680 t) giving a speed of 38.95 kn (44.82 mph; 72.14 km/h), and Shakespeare briefly reached a speed of 42.5 kn (48.9 mph; 78.7 km/h) during trials. Up to 500 tons of oil fuel could be carried, giving a range of 5,000 nautical miles (9,300 km; 5,800 mi) at 15 knots (28 km/h; 17 mph).

The class had a main gun armament consisted of five 4.7 in (120 mm)/45 calibre BL Mark I guns, (Note: In British practice, BL (Breech Loading) indicated that a separate, bagged, charge was used.) on CP VI mountings capable of elevating to 30 degrees, arranged in two superfiring pairs fore and aft of the superstructure with the remaining gun positioned on a platform between the funnels. Shakespeare's anti-aircraft armament consisted of a single 3 in (76 mm) gun on a platform abaft the rear funnel. Torpedo armament consisted of two triple mounts for 21-inch (533 mm) torpedo tubes between the 3-inch AA gun and the rear pair of 4.7-inch guns. Four depth charges were carried.

The first two examples of Thornycroft's new large leader, Shakespeare and Spenser, were ordered in April 1916. A third was ordered in April 1917 and four more in April 1918. Shakespeare was laid down at Thonycroft's Woolston, Hampshire shipyard on 2 October 1916, was launched on 7 July 1917 and commissioned on 10 October 1917.

== Service ==
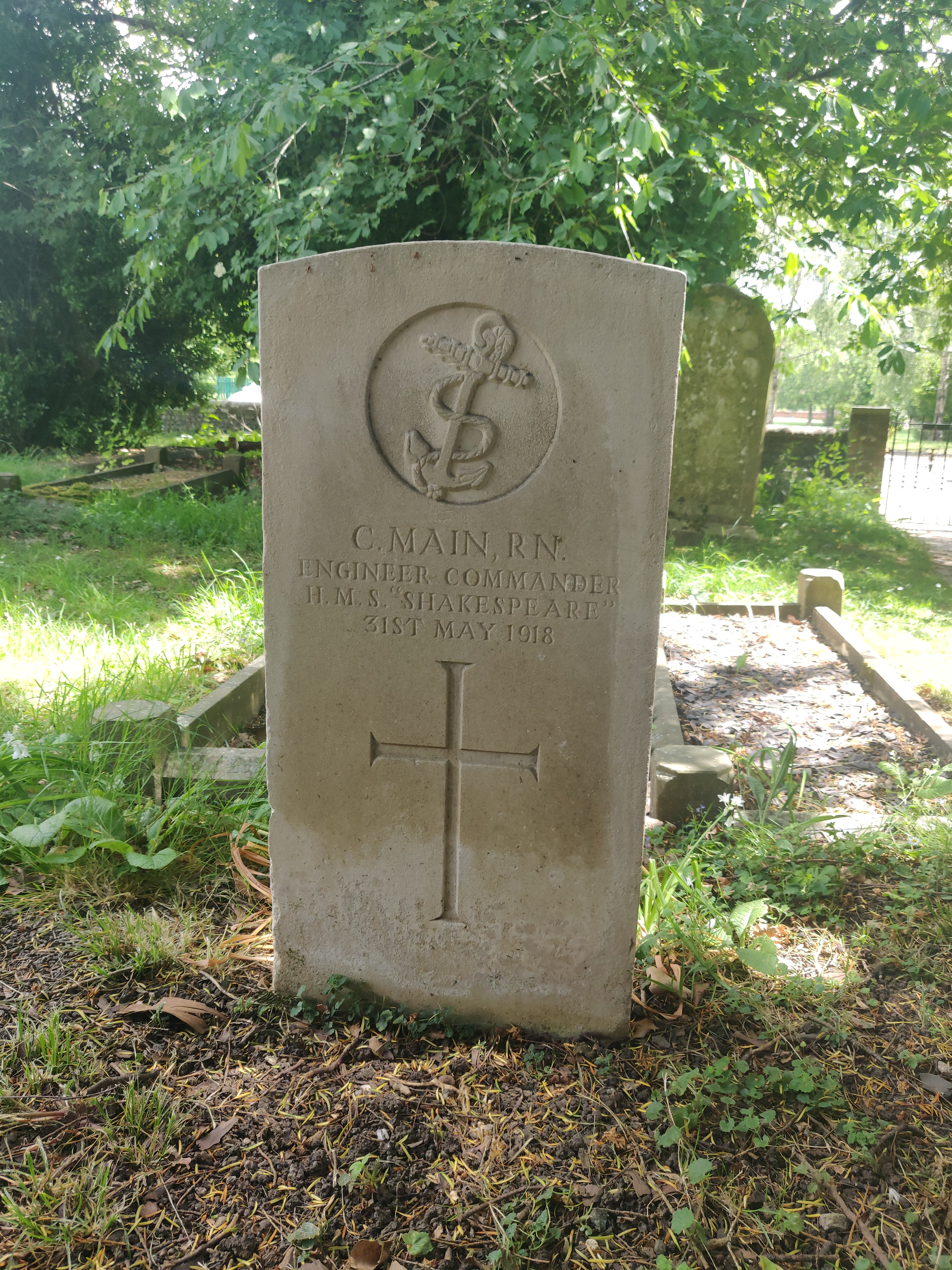
Grave of C. Main, killed when HMS Shakespeare struck a naval mine.

After commissioning, Shakespeare had defects repaired at Portsmouth before joining the 10th Destroyer Flotilla as part of the Harwich Force on 14 November 1917. On 31 May 1918, Shakespeare struck a mine off Harwich, which killed one of her crew. She was towed back into port by the cruiser Centaur and was under repair at Chatham Dockyard until 21 October 1918. Shakespeare returned to the 10th Flotilla after repair, and was still part of that flotilla at the end of the war on 11 November 1918.

The Royal Navy's destroyer forces were reorganised after the end of the war, with Shakespeare becoming leader of the newly established 2nd Destroyer Flotilla, based at Rosyth in March 1919. Shakespeare made several deployments to the Baltic Sea as part of the British operations in the Baltic during the Russian Civil War. On 18 May 1919, British forces operating near Seskar in the Gulf of Finland support of Estonian forces and watching the Bolshevik Fleet based at Kronstadt, spotted a sortie by four Bolshevik minesweepers, covered by the destroyer Gavriil. Shakespeare, together with the cruiser Cleopatra and the destroyers Scout and Walker set off to intercept the Bolshevik forces, which withdrew behind minefields and the protection of shore batteries. In an exchange of fire, Gavriil received splinter damage from British near misses, while the British ships were unharmed.

On 21 June 1919, the ships of the German High Seas Fleet, interned at Scapa Flow, was scuttled by their crews. The British Fleet was away from Scapa at the time, but hurried back on hearing reports of the scuttling. Shakespeare was one of the British ships that responded to the alarm, and on arrival at Scapa, attempted to take the German cruiser Emden under tow. Emden was beached to avoid sinking. Shakespeare was again deployed to the Baltic from 12 August 1919, where the British forces were supporting an Estonian offensive against Saint Petersburg. On 27 October, Shakespeare took part in a bombardment of the Bolshevik-held Krasnaya Gorka fort, together with the monitor Erebus, the cruisers Delhi and Dunedin, the leaders Mackay and Spenser and four destroyers. Despite the support from the Royal Navy, the Estonian assault failed. This deployment ended in November 1919, with Shakespeare returning to British waters.

Shakespeare returned to the Baltic in July 1920, but hostilities between Britain and the Bolshevik forces had ceased. In May 1921, the Royal Navy's destroyer forces were again reorganised, with smaller flotillas of eight destroyers and a leader replacing the previous large flotillas, with Shakespeare joined the newly formed 6th Destroyer Flotilla as leader. Shakespeare was deployed to Irish waters from 9 May to 22 June 1921, as the Irish War of Independence continued. Shakespeare joined the 7th Destroyer Flotilla at Rosyth in June 1922, initially as a "private ship" (i.e. not as leader), being relieved from the 6th Flotilla by Valhalla, but becoming leader of the 7th Flotilla on 27 September 1923.

Shakespeare entered reserve at the Nore on 21 December 1925, at first serving as leader of the reserve 9th Flotilla, with a reduced crew. In 1927–1928, as an economy measure, reserve destroyers were transferred to a centralised Maintenance Reserve, with most reserve destroyers having no crews assigned and only undergoing essential repair work. In fact, however, the resources (both manpower and financial) allocated to the uptake of reserve destroyers was inadequate, and their condition deteriorated, so that most of them never returned to active service. Shakespeare was towed from Chatham to Rosyth in March 1933, and on 19 August 1936, was one of a number of old warships transferred to the shipbreaker Thos. W. Ward in exchange for the old ocean liner Majestic, which the Royal Navy wanted as a training ship. Shakespeare was handed over to Wards on 2 September that year and scrapped at their Jarrow works.

== Pennant numbers ==
Pennant number	From	To
F89	January 1918	October 1919
D50	November 1919	1936
