= SMS G193 =

History

German Empire
- Name: SMS G193
- Builder: Germaniawerft, Kiel
- Launched: 10 December 1910
- Completed: 25 June 1911
- Fate: Scrapped 1922

General characteristics
- Class & type: S138-class torpedo boat
- Displacement: 660 t (650 long tons) design
- Length: 74.0 m (242 ft 9 in) o/a
- Beam: 7.06 m (23 ft 2 in)
- Draught: 3.1 m (10 ft 2 in)
- Installed power: 18,200 PS (18,000 shp; 13,400 kW)
- Propulsion: 3 × boilers; 2 × steam turbines
- Speed: 32 kn (37 mph; 59 km/h)
- Complement: 84
- Armament: 2× 8.8 cm guns; 4× 50 cm torpedo tubes

SMS G193 (Note: "SMS" stands for "Seiner Majestät Schiff" (transl. His Majesty's Ship)) (Note: The "G" in G193 denoted the shipbuilder who constructed her.) was a S-138-class large torpedo boat of the Imperial German Navy. She was built by the Germaniawerft shipyard at Kiel between 1910 and 1911, and was launched on 10 December 1910, entering service in 1911.

G193 served throughout the First World War, operating both in the North Sea and the Baltic. After the war, she was surrendered as a war reparation, and was scrapped in 1922.

== Design ==
The Imperial German Navy ordered 12 large torpedo boats (Große Torpedoboote) as part of the fiscal year 1910 shipbuilding programme, with one half-flotilla of six ships ordered from Germaniawerft and the other six ships from AG Vulcan. As with normal practice for the German Navy, the two groups of torpedo boats of basically similar layout but differed slightly in detailed design, with the designs showing a gradual pattern of refinements and increase in displacement with each year's orders.

The 1910 Germaniawerft torpedo boats were 74.0 metres (242 ft 9 in) long overall and 73.6 metres (241 ft 6 in) between perpendiculars, with a beam of 7.06 metres (23 ft 2 in) and a draught of 3.1 metres (10 ft 2 in). The ships displaced 660 tonnes (650 long tons) design and 810 tonnes (800 long tons) deep load.

Three coal-fired and one oil-fired water-tube boiler fed steam at a pressure of 18.5 standard atmospheres (272 psi) to two sets of direct-drive steam turbines. The ship's machinery was rated at 18,200 PS (18,000 shp; 13,400 kW) giving a design speed of 32 knots (37 mph; 59 km/h), with members of the class reaching a speed of 33.5 knots (38.6 mph; 62.0 km/h) during sea trials. 145 tons of coal and 76 tons of oil fuel were carried, giving an endurance of 2,590 nautical miles (2,980 mi; 4,800 km) at 12 knots (14 mph; 22 km/h), 1,150 nautical miles (1,320 mi; 2,130 km) at 17 knots (20 mph; 31 km/h) or 420 nautical miles (480 mi; 780 km) at 30 knots (35 mph; 56 km/h).

The ships were armed with two 8.8 cm L/45 guns, (Note: Both Conway's All The World's Fighting Ships and Jane's Fighting Ships claim L/30 guns were fitted.) one on the forecastle and one aft. Four single 50 cm (19.7 in) torpedo tubes were fitted, with two on the ship's beam in the gap between the forecastle and the ship's bridge which were capable of firing straight ahead, one between the ship's two funnels, and one aft of the funnels. The ship had a crew of 84 officers and men.

== Construction and service ==
G193 was laid down at Germaniawerft's Kiel shipyard as Yard number 152 and was launched on 10 December 1910 and was completed on 25 June 1911.

On commissioning, G193 joined the 2nd half flotilla of the 1st Torpedo Boat Flotilla. G192 remained part of the 2nd half flotilla through 1913 and into 1914.

=== First World War ===
G193 remained part of the 2nd half-flotilla of the 1st Torpedo Boat Flotilla on the outbreak of the First World War in August 1914. On 28 August 1914, the British Harwich Force, supported by light cruisers and battlecruisers of the Grand Fleet, carried out a raid towards Heligoland with the intention of destroying patrolling German torpedo boats. The German defensive patrols around Heligoland consisted of one flotilla (the 1st Flotilla) of 12 modern torpedo boats forming an outer patrol line about 25 nautical miles (29 mi; 46 km) North and West of Heligoland, with an inner line of older torpedo boats of the 3rd Minesweeping Division at about 12 nautical miles (14 mi; 22 km). Four German light cruisers and another flotilla of torpedo boats (5th Torpedo Boat Flotilla) was in the vicinity of Heligoland. G193 formed part of the outer screen of torpedo boats. V193, at the eastern end of the patrol line, was not engaged when the British attacked, and remained on station until recalled to Heligoland by radio. V187, leader of the 1st Flotilla, was sunk, as were the cruisers Mainz, Cöln and Ariadne, while the torpedo boats V1, D8 and T33 were damaged. The British light cruiser Arethusa and destroyers Laurel, Laertes and Liberty were badly damaged but safely returned to base. From 15 to 17 December 1914, the 1st Torpedo Boat Flotilla, including G193, accompanied German battlecruisers during the Raid on Scarborough, Hartlepool and Whitby. On the return journey from the bombardment, the 1st Flotilla sighted the British battleships of the 2nd Battle Squadron, but could not mount a torpedo attack owing to the heavy seas and excessive range to the British ships.

In August 1915 the Germans detached a large portion of the High Seas Fleet for operations in the Gulf of Riga in support of the advance of German troops. It was planned to enter the Gulf via the Irben Strait, defeating any Russian naval forces and mining the entrance to Moon Sound. The torpedo boats of I Flotilla, including G193 was deployed in support of these operations, with G193, V191 and G194 encountering and exchanging fire with the large Russian destroyer Novik and two smaller destroyers of the Emir Bukharski-class on 11 August. (Note: 14 August according to Fock)

On 25 March 1916, the British seaplane carrier Vindex, escorted by the Harwich force, launched an air attack against a Zeppelin base believed to be at Hoyer on the coast of Schleswig. The raid was a failure, with the airship base actually at Tondern, and the British destroyer Medusa was rammed by the destroyer Laverock. (Medusa was later abandoned and eventually sank). Forces of the High Seas Fleet were ordered to sea in response to the attack, and on the evening of 25 March, 18 German torpedo boats of the 1st and 6th Torpedo Boat Flotillas, including G192 were deployed in a wide front with orders to search for Medusa to the North West of Horns Rev. During the night of 25/26 March, G193 and G194 suddenly encountered cruisers of the Harwich force. G193, by turning hard to port, just managed to avoid colliding with the leading cruiser, and escaped behind a smoke-screen, but G194, following, was rammed and sunk by the British cruiser Cleopatra, killing all of G194's crew. Cleopatra was in turn was rammed and damaged by the cruiser Undaunted. Another German group, deployed in a westward search lost the torpedo boat S22 to a mine.

G193, still part of the 1st Torpedo Boat Flotilla, was part of the High Seas Fleet when it sailed to cover the Lowestoft Raid on 24–25 April 1916, but did not take part in the Battle of Jutland on 31 May–1 June 1916, as one of seven older torpedo boats of the 1st Torpedo Boat Flotilla left behind. G193 remained part of the 1st Torpedo Boat Flotilla on 19 August 1916, when the High Seas Fleet sailed to cover a sortie of the battlecruisers of the 1st Scouting Group in the inconclusive Action of 19 August 1916.

On 22 February 1918 the ship was renamed T193, in order to free her number for new construction, in this case the destroyer H193 which was ordered from Howaldswerke, but was cancelled before starting construction. In November 1918, at the end of the war, T193 was a member of the 15th half-flotilla of the 8th Torpedo Boat Flotilla.

=== Disposal ===
After the end of the war, while a large proportion of the German navy, including 50 torpedo boats, was interned at Scapa Flow, T193 initially remained under the control of the Weimar Republic's navy, the Reichsmarine. The Treaty of Versailles required the handing over of, amongst other things, "42 modern destroyers" in addition to those at Scapa which were scuttled on 21 June 1919, and T193 was one of the ships surrendered to meet this requirement. She was one of 20 German torpedo boats delivered to Cherbourg in France for consideration by France and Italy for incorporation into their navies, but was not wanted by either navy. The unwanted ships were to be scrapped by Britain, and T193 was sold on 22 October 1921 and was scrapped at Chatham in 1922.
