= SMS V191 =

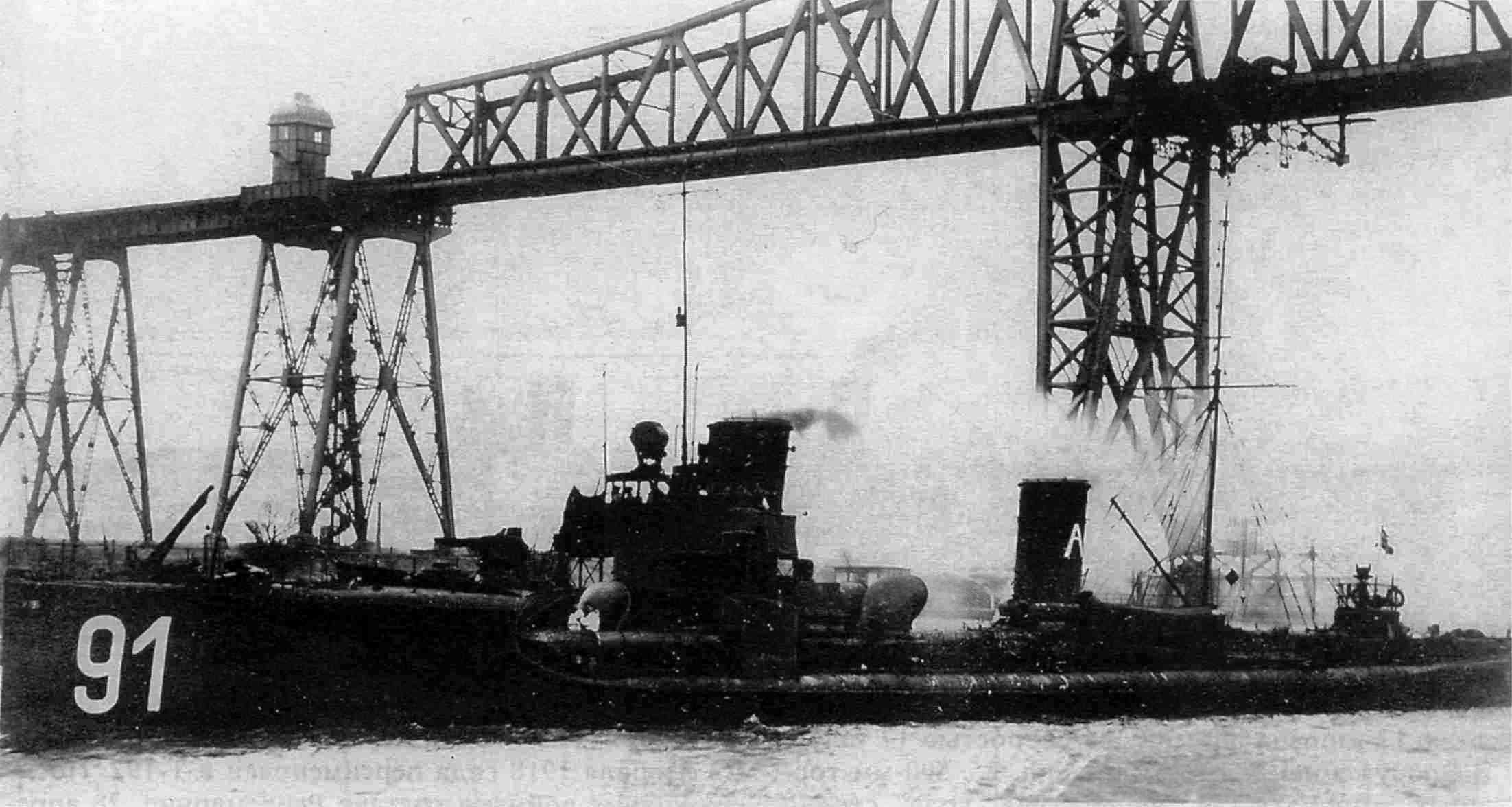

History

German Empire
- Name: SMS V191
- Builder: AG Vulcan, Stettin
- Launched: 2 June 1911
- Completed: 28 September 1911
- Fate: Mined 17 December 1915

General characteristics
- Class & type: S138-class torpedo boat
- Displacement: 650 t (640 long tons) design
- Length: 73.9 m (242 ft 5 in) o/a
- Beam: 7.9 m (25 ft 11 in)
- Draught: 3.1 m (10 ft 2 in)
- Installed power: 18,000 PS (18,000 shp; 13,000 kW)
- Propulsion: 3 × boilers; 2 × steam turbines
- Speed: 32 kn (37 mph; 59 km/h)
- Complement: 84
- Armament: 2× 8.8 cm guns; 4× 50 cm torpedo tubes

SMS V191 (Note: "SMS" stands for "Seiner Majestät Schiff" (transl. His Majesty's Ship)) (Note: The "V" in V191 denoted the shipbuilder who constructed her, in this case AG Vulcan.) was a S-138-class large torpedo boat of the Imperial German Navy. She was built by the AG Vulcan shipyard at Stettin between 1910 and 1911 and launched on 2 June 1911.

V191 took part the First World War. She was present at the Battle of Heligoland Bight in August 1914. She was sunk when she struck a Russian mine in the Baltic on 17 December 1915

== Construction and design ==
The Imperial German Navy ordered 12 large torpedo boats (Große Torpedoboote) as part of the fiscal year 1910 shipbuilding programme, with one half-flotilla of six ships (V186–V191) ordered from AG Vulcan and the other six ships from Germaniawerft. The two groups of torpedo boats were of basically similar layout but differed slightly in detailed design, with a gradual evolution of design and increase in displacement with each year's orders.

V191 was 73.9 metres (242 ft 5 in) long overall and 73.6 metres (241 ft 6 in) between perpendiculars, with a beam of 7.9 metres (25 ft 11 in) and a draught of 3.1 metres (10 ft 2 in). The ship displaced 666 tonnes (655 long tons) design and 775 tonnes (763 long tons) deep load.

Three coal-fired and one oil-fired water-tube boiler fed steam at a pressure of 18.5 standard atmospheres (272 psi) to two sets of direct-drive steam turbines. The ship's machinery was rated at 18,000 PS (18,000 shp; 13,000 kW) giving a design speed of 32 knots (37 mph; 59 km/h), with members of the class reaching a speed of 33.5 knots (38.6 mph; 62.0 km/h) during sea trials. 136 tons of coal and 67 tons of oil fuel were carried, giving an endurance of 2,360 nautical miles (2,720 mi; 4,370 km) at 12 knots (14 mph; 22 km/h), 1,250 nautical miles (1,440 mi; 2,320 km) at 17 knots (20 mph; 31 km/h) or 480 nautical miles (550 mi; 890 km) at 30 knots (35 mph; 56 km/h).

The ship was armed with two 8.8 cm L/45 guns, (Note: Both Conway's All The World's Fighting Ships and Jane's Fighting Ships claim L/30 guns were fitted.) one on the Forecastle and one aft. Four single 50 cm (19.7 in) torpedo tubes were fitted, with two on the ship's beam in the gap between the forecastle and the ship's bridge which were capable of firing straight ahead, one between the ship's two funnels, and one aft of the funnels. The ship had a crew of 84 officers and men.

V191 was laid down at AG Vulcan's Stettin shipyard as Yard number 309 and was launched on 2 June 1911 and completed on 28 September 1911.

== Service ==
=== First World War ===
On 28 August 1914, the British Harwich Force, supported by light cruisers and battlecruisers of the Grand Fleet, carried out a raid towards Heligoland with the intention of destroying patrolling German torpedo boats. The German defensive patrols around Heligoland consisted of one flotilla (I Torpedo Flotilla) of 12 modern torpedo boats forming an outer patrol line about 25 nautical miles (29 mi; 46 km) North and West of Heligoland, with an inner line of older torpedo boats of the 3rd Minesweeping Division at about 12 nautical miles (14 mi; 22 km). Four German light cruisers and another flotilla of torpedo boats (V Torpedo Boat Flotilla) was in the vicinity of Heligoland. V191 , a member of the 1st Half Flotilla of I Torpedo Boat Flotilla, formed part of the outer screen of torpedo boats. At about 06:00 on 28 August, G194, another member of the outer screen reported spotting the periscope of a submarine. As a result, the 5th Torpedo Boat Flotilla was ordered out to hunt the hostile submarine. At 07:57 G194 was fired on by British warships, and was soon retreating towards Heligoland, pursued by four British destroyers. V Flotilla and the old torpedo boats of the 3rd Minesweeping Division also came under British fire, and were only saved by the intervention of the German cruisers Stettin and Frauenlob, with the torpedo boats V1, D8 and T33 damaged. V191 managed to successfully avoid the British ships and returned to base. However, sister ship V187, leader of I Flotilla, ran into the midst of the Harwich force when trying to return to Heligoland and was sunk. The intervention of the supporting British forces resulted in the sinking of the German cruisers Mainz, Cöln and Ariadne. The British light cruiser Arethusa and destroyers Laurel, Laertes and Liberty were badly damaged but safely returned to base.

In August 1915 the Germans detached a large portion of the High Seas Fleet for operations in the Gulf of Riga in support of the advance of German troops. It was planned to enter the Gulf via the Irben Strait, defeating any Russian naval forces and mining the entrance to Moon Sound. The torpedo boats of I Flotilla, including V191 was deployed in support of these operations, with V191, G193 and G194 encountering and exchanging fire with the large Russian destroyer Novik and two smaller destroyers of the Emir Bukharski-class on 11 August. On 17 December 1915, (Note: Halpern states the two ships were sunk on 16 December, but Conways, Gröner and Rollmann all say that the two ships were sunk on 17 December) V191 and the light cruiser Bremen were sunk in a minefield between Windau (now Ventspils, Latvia) and Lyserort. 25 of V191's crew were killed.
