= Murray Anderson (Royal Navy officer) =

British naval officer and politician

Admiral Sir Murray Anderson KCB KCMG MVO
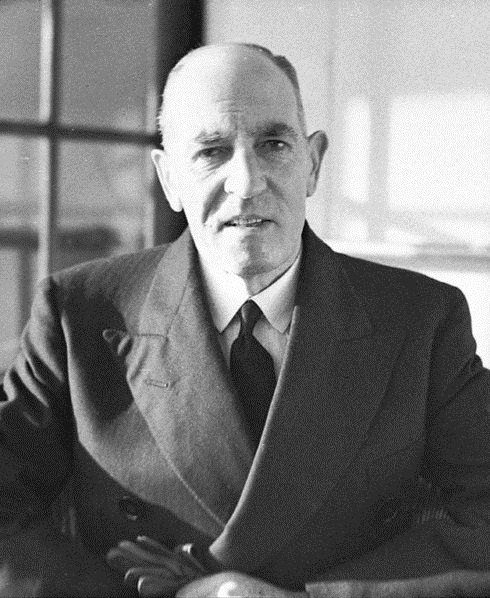
- Anderson at Government House upon his arrival in Sydney

28th Governor of New South Wales
- In office 6 August 1936 – 30 October 1936
- Monarch: Edward VIII
- Premier: Bertram Stevens
- Lieutenant: Sir Philip Street
- Preceded by: The Lord Gowrie
- Succeeded by: The Lord Wakehurst

66th Governor of Newfoundland
- In office 20 October 1932 – 12 January 1936
- Monarch: George V
- Prime Minister: Frederick C. Alderdice (Note: Office of Prime Minister abolished on 16 February 1934.)
- Preceded by: John Middleton
- Succeeded by: Humphrey T. Walwyn

Personal details
- Born: 11 April 1874 Newton-by-Chester, Cheshire, England
- Died: 30 October 1936 (aged 62) Sydney, New South Wales, Australia
- Spouse(s): Dame Edith Muriel Anderson (née Teschemaker)

Military service
- Allegiance: United Kingdom
- Branch/service: Royal Navy
- Years of service: 1887–1932
- Rank: Admiral
- Commands: Africa Station (1926–29); China Station (1925); HMS Ajax (1918–19); HMS Hyacinth (1913–17)
- Battles/wars: Ashanti campaign First World War: East African campaign
- Awards: Knight Commander of the Order of the Bath; Knight Commander of the Order of St Michael and St George; Member of the Royal Victorian Order; Knight of the Order of Saint John; Mentioned in despatches

Admiral Sir David Murray Anderson, KCB, KCMG, MVO (11 April 1874 – 30 October 1936) was a British naval officer and governor. Anderson served in the Royal Navy from the age of 13 and served in many colonial wars and was given various Empire postings, rising to the rank of admiral in 1931. He retired a year later and took up the posting as Governor of Newfoundland, where he also took up the role of Chairman of the Government following the suspension of self-government in the Dominion of Newfoundland. Leaving Newfoundland in 1935, he was appointed as Governor of New South Wales but served only briefly due to his ill health. He died while in office aged 62.

== Early life and career ==
Anderson was born on 11 April 1874, the second son of General David Anderson, Colonel of the Cheshire Regiment, and his wife Charlotte Christina, née Anderson in Newton-by-Chester in Cheshire, England. His elder brother was Lieutenant General Sir Warren Hastings Anderson. In 1887, as a 13-year-old, he became a naval cadet in the training ship Britannia at Dartmouth. Seeing action against King Koko slave traders on the Niger River, he became a lieutenant on 23 February 1895 at age 20. Anderson saw further action against West-African rebels and in the Ashanti Campaign. In May 1902, he was posted as first and gunnery lieutenant to the cruiser HMS Brilliant on the Channel Squadron.

In 1905 Anderson was promoted to commander and was posted to the Royal Yacht Victoria and Albert in 1908. That year, he married a New Zealander, Edith Muriel Teschemaker, the daughter of one of the pioneers of the Otago region. On 29 July 1910 Anderson was appointed a Member of the Fourth Class of the Royal Victorian Order. On 11 August 1911, he was promoted to captain and posted as Flag Captain on HMS Hyacinth from 1913 to 1917.

When the First World War broke out Anderson took part in the operations that resulted in the destruction of the SMS Königsberg in German East Africa, and was mentioned in despatches in 1915. For his actions leading to the capture of Dar es Salaam he was appointed a Companion of the Order of St Michael and St George on 1 January 1918. He was also invested by the Sultan of Zanzibar with the Order of the Brilliant Star of Zanzibar, Second Class. From 1918 to 1919 Anderson was posted to command the battleship HMS Ajax in the Grand Fleet. In May 1921 he was appointed as an aide-de-camp (ADC) to King George V, which he held until April 1922. After a posting in England, he was promoted to rear admiral in 1922. In the 1923 Birthday Honours he was appointed a Companion of the Order of the Bath (CB). He was later posted from August 1923 to October 1925 as the Senior Naval Officer, Yangtze, and briefly served as temporary Commander-in-Chief China Station in 1925. While in China, he was called upon on three separate occasions to command a multi-national force of Japanese, British, American, Portuguese and Italian sailors to help protect the Shanghai International Settlement. For his efforts in China, he was awarded the Order of the Rising Sun, Third Class, by Emperor Hirohito of Japan.

Further promoted to vice admiral in 1927, Anderson was appointed to command the Africa Station. From June to September 1928 he served as High Commissioner to the Union of South Africa. Being fluent in French, he was further appointed to Geneva as the Admiralty representative to the League of Nations permanent advisory commission from 1929 to 1931. On 3 June 1930 he was appointed as a Knight Commander of the Order of the Bath, and was promoted to admiral in 1931. He retired at his own request on 5 July 1932.

== Governor of Newfoundland ==
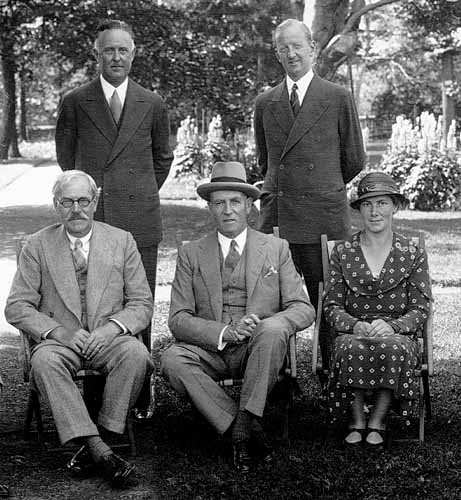
Anderson entertaining Ramsay MacDonald (seated, left), Prime Minister of the United Kingdom, at Government House in August 1934

Anderson was then appointed on 20 October 1932 as the Governor of Newfoundland. He became His Majesty's Representative at a time of great instability in the Dominion of Newfoundland. Newfoundland had been hit badly by the Great Depression, leaving most of the banks on the verge of insolvency, saved only by emergency loans from Britain, the state Treasury was empty and the political process was discredited by corruption and incompetence.

The Government, led by Prime Minister Frederick C. Alderdice, called upon the British government to take direct control until Newfoundland could become self-sustaining. The United Kingdom, concerned over Newfoundland's likelihood of defaulting on its loans, asked the government to establish the Newfoundland Royal Commission, headed by a Scottish peer, Lord Amulree. Its report, released in 1933, assessed Newfoundland's political system as institutionally corrupt and its economic future as bleak, recommending the abolition of responsible government, and its replacement by a Commission of the British Government. Acting on the report's recommendations, Alderdice's government voted itself out of existence in December 1933. Appointed as chair of the Commission of Government in 1934, Anderson found his role as Governor with significantly expanded powers and proved himself up to the job, constantly sending reports back to the Dominions Office and giving advice to the Dominions Secretary on how to deal with the Commission members.

Despite his new-found powers, Anderson took the position of neutral mediator, intervening only when there was a dispute in the commission. He was nevertheless involved with restructuring the administration of the state, including government departments, social services, the health system and the postal system. His approach proved to be not enough to bring the Commission out of petty arguments and disputes and in October 1935 it was announced that he would be replaced by another Naval officer, Sir Humphrey Walwyn. Anderson and his wife departed from Newfoundland the following January.

== Governor of New South Wales ==
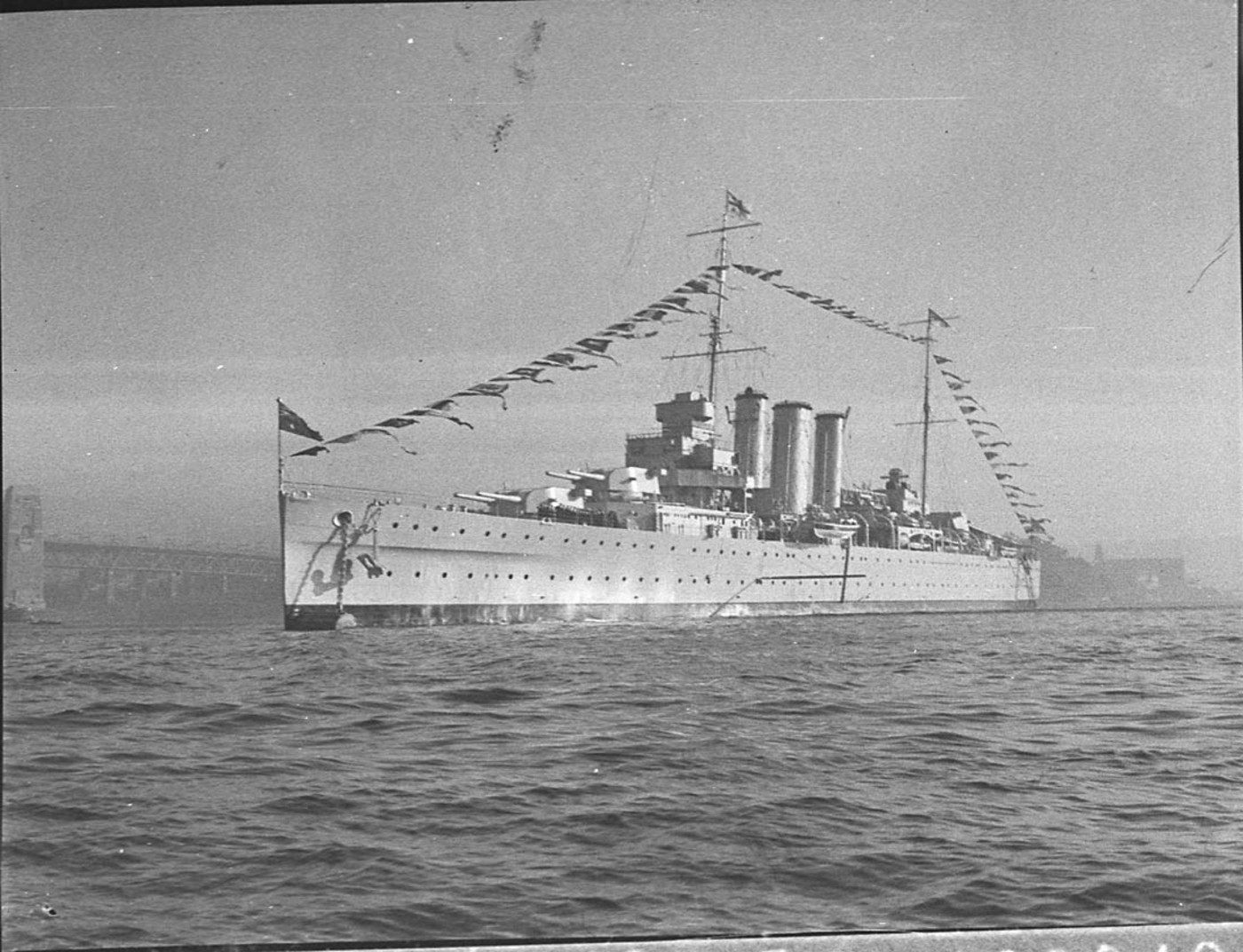
County-class cruiser HMAS Canberra entering Sydney Harbour on 6 August 1936 carrying Sir Murray and Lady Anderson

In November 1935 it was announced that Anderson was to become the Governor of New South Wales, a relatively quieter post. He was invested by King Edward VIII as a Knight Commander of the Order of St Michael and St George on 5 May 1936, and as a Knight of Grace of the Venerable Order of St John of Jerusalem on 23 June 1936.

En route to Australia Anderson was taken ill, and had to spend six weeks in hospital in Perth, Western Australia. He was sworn in at Sydney on 6 August 1936. Because of his recurring illness, Lady Anderson undertook many official duties on his behalf, while the Lieutenant Governor of New South Wales, Sir Philip Street, carried out his legislative and ceremonial duties. On 29 October he collapsed and died of a cerebral haemorrhage early in the morning the next day at Government House.

=== Funeral and burial ===
His body was laid in state in St. Andrew's Cathedral, Sydney by way of a gun carriage pulled by the sailors and officers of HMAS Canberra on 2 November 1936. The funeral was attended by the Governor-General, The Lord Gowrie, and the Premier, Bertram Stevens, who gave an address:

"To those who knew him, the State seems a poorer place for the passing of a gallant and high-hearted gentleman. To those who did not have the privilege of personal acquaintance there comes the regret appropriate to the death of the man who, under his Majesty, was the titular head of our State; a proven servant of the Empire, a man whose honours were deserved, and who carried his distinctions with grace, has gone to his rest. The tragic shortness of the tenure of his last high office has brought no small loss to our State. Only those who knew him, who had the benefit of his kindliness and experience, know how great that loss actually is. Time gave him no chance to prove himself to the mass of the people; but all those who came into contact with him knew the sterling qualities which were in his character. He was a man upon whom authority sat quietly and easily."

Following the funeral, his body, embalmed and enclosed in lead coffin with an outer wood casket by Wood Coffill Funeral Directors, was conveyed to the Chapel of Bishopscourt, Darling Point, the residence of the Anglican Archbishop of Sydney, Howard Mowll. On 18 November 1936, Lady Anderson departed Sydney by train to Adelaide with his body to return to England aboard the RMS Orontes on 21 November. On 4 January 1937, Anderson was buried in the Churchyard of St Mary the Virgin, in Fittleworth, West Sussex, in a ceremony attended by Admiral Sir Edward Charlton, Rear-Admiral Edward Hilary Rymer, Vice-Admiral William Douglas Paton, Rear-Admiral Sir Arthur Bromley, Vice-Admiral Sir Percy Noble, and Vice-Admiral William Bowden-Smith.

Survived by his wife and with no children, Anderson left an estate valued at £9,654, which he gave to his wife for life and on her death to relatives. On the recommendation of the NSW Government, Lady Anderson was granted the rank of Dame Commander of the Order of the British Empire (DBE) and the King George VI Coronation Medal in the 1937 Coronation Honours for public service in New South Wales.

== Honours ==
Viceregal styles of Sir David Anderson
- Reference style: His Excellency
- Spoken style: Your Excellency

Knight Commander of the Order of the Bath (KCB)	1930
Companion of the Order of the Bath (CB)	1923
Knight Commander of the Order of St Michael and St George (KCMG)	1936
Companion of the Order of St Michael and St George (CMG)	1918
Member of the Royal Victorian Order (MVO)	1910
Knight of Grace of the Venerable Order of St John of Jerusalem	1936
Africa General Service Medal	
1914–15 Star	
British War Medal	
Victory Medal with MID Palm	
King Edward VII Coronation Medal	1902
King George V Coronation Medal	1911
King George V Silver Jubilee Medal	1935
The Order of St. Anna (Russia)	
The Order of the Redeemer (Greece)	
Knight of the Order of the Dannebrog (Denmark)	
Order of the Brilliant Star of Zanzibar, Second Class (Zanzibar)	
Order of the Rising Sun, 3rd Class, Gold Rays with Neck Ribbon (Japan)	

=== Honorific eponyms ===
- Mount Murray Anderson, Ku-ring-gai Chase National Park (1936).

Military offices
Preceded by Sir Allan Everett	Commander-in-Chief, China Station (Acting); 1925	Succeeded by Sir Edwyn Alexander-Sinclair
Preceded by Sir Maurice Fitzmaurice	Commander-in-Chief, Africa Station; 1926–1929	Succeeded by Sir Rudolph Burmester
Diplomatic posts
Preceded by Sir Walter Hely-Hutchinson	British High Commissioner to South Africa; 1928	Succeeded by Sir Edward Evans
Government offices
Preceded by Sir John Middleton	Governor of Newfoundland; 1933–1935	Succeeded by Sir Humphrey Walwyn
Preceded by Frederick C. Alderdice as Prime Minister of Newfoundland	Chairman of the Commission of Government of Newfoundland; 1934–1935	Succeeded by Sir Humphrey Walwyn
Preceded by The Lord Gowrie	Governor of New South Wales; 1936	Succeeded by The Lord Wakehurst
