= HMS Keppel =

HMS Keppel can refer to ships of the Royal Navy named after Admiral Augustus Keppel

- HMS Keppel (1778) - was the American 14-gun privateer brig New Broom that the Royal Navy captured in 1778. Sold in 1783.
- HMS Keppel (D84) - a Thornycroft type destroyer leader, launched 1920, broken up 1945.
- HMS Keppel (F85) - a Blackwood-class frigate, decommissioned in the 1970s
