= Hastings Anderson =

British Army general (1872–1930)

Lieutenant-General Sir Hastings Anderson KCB
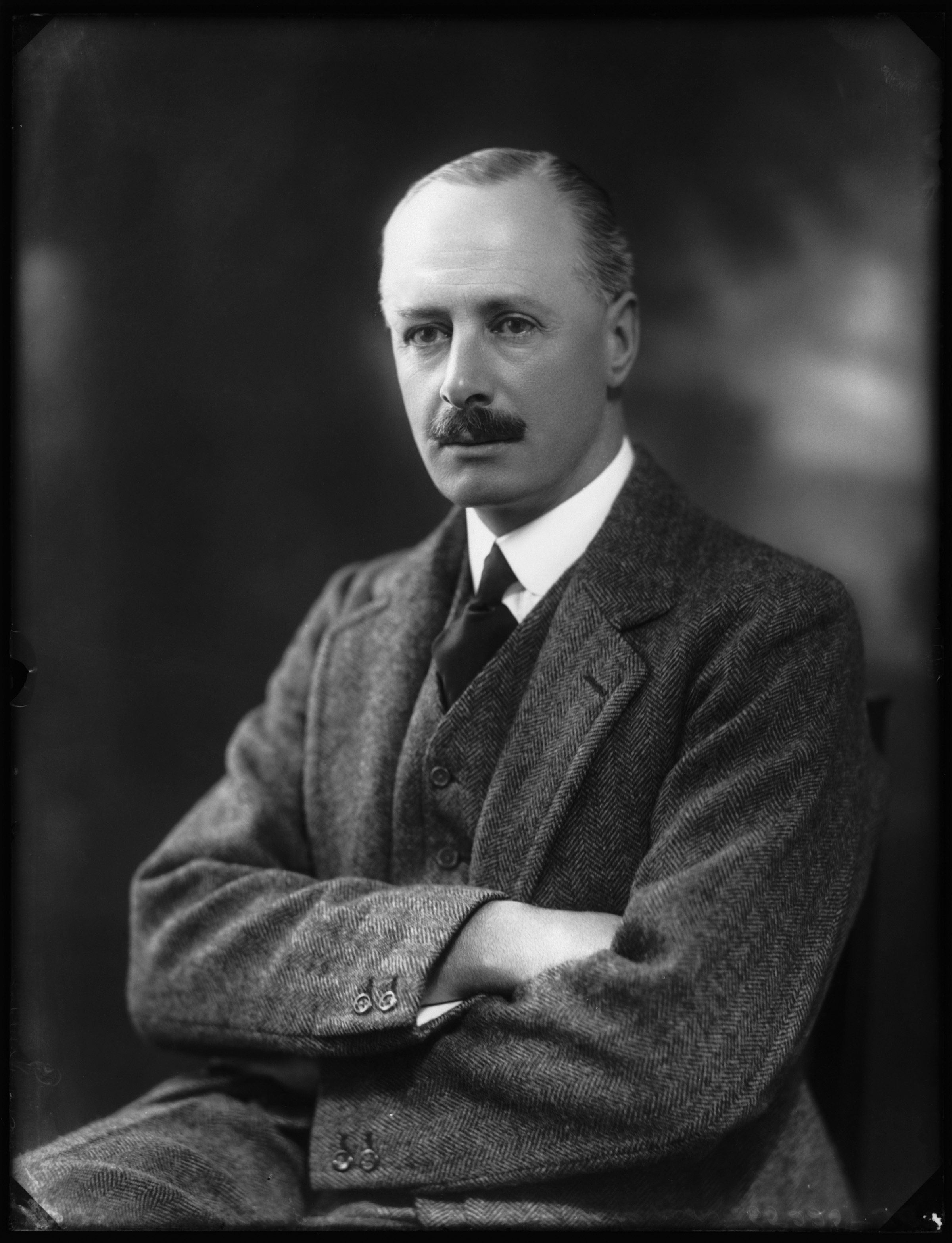
- Born: Warren Hastings Anderson; 9 January 1872; Aldershot, Surrey, England
- Died: 11 December 1930 (aged 58); London, England
- Relatives: General David Anderson (father); Admiral Sir David Murray Anderson (brother)
- Military career
- Allegiance: United Kingdom
- Branch: British Army
- Service years: 1890–1930
- Rank: Lieutenant-General
- Commands: Baluchistan District; Staff College, Camberley
- Conflicts: Second Boer War; First World War
- Awards: Knight Commander of the Order of the Bath; Mentioned in Despatches; Officer of the Legion of Honour; Croix de Guerre (France)

Lieutenant-General Sir Warren Hastings Anderson, KCB (9 January 1872 – 11 December 1930) was a senior British Army officer who served as Quartermaster-General to the Forces from 1927 to 1930.

== Military career ==
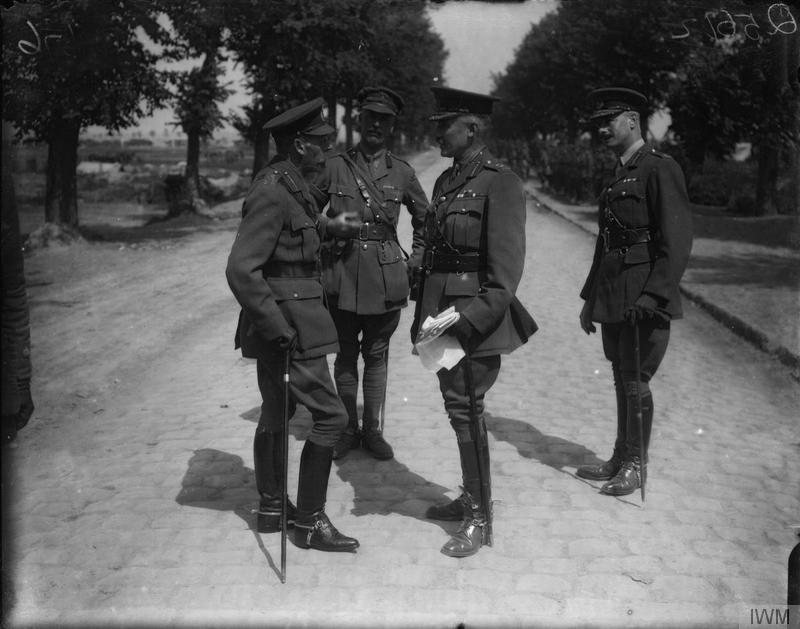
King George V talking to General Sir Henry Horne, whilst visiting the First Army area, 11 July 1917. Stood behind Horne is his MGGS, Hastings Anderson.

Anderson was born the first son of General David Anderson, Colonel-in-Chief of the Cheshire Regiment, and his wife, Charlotte Christina (née Anderson). Educated at Marlborough College and the Royal Military College, Sandhurst, Anderson was commissioned into the Cheshire Regiment as a second lieutenant on 8 October 1890, and promoted to lieutenant on 9 January 1894.

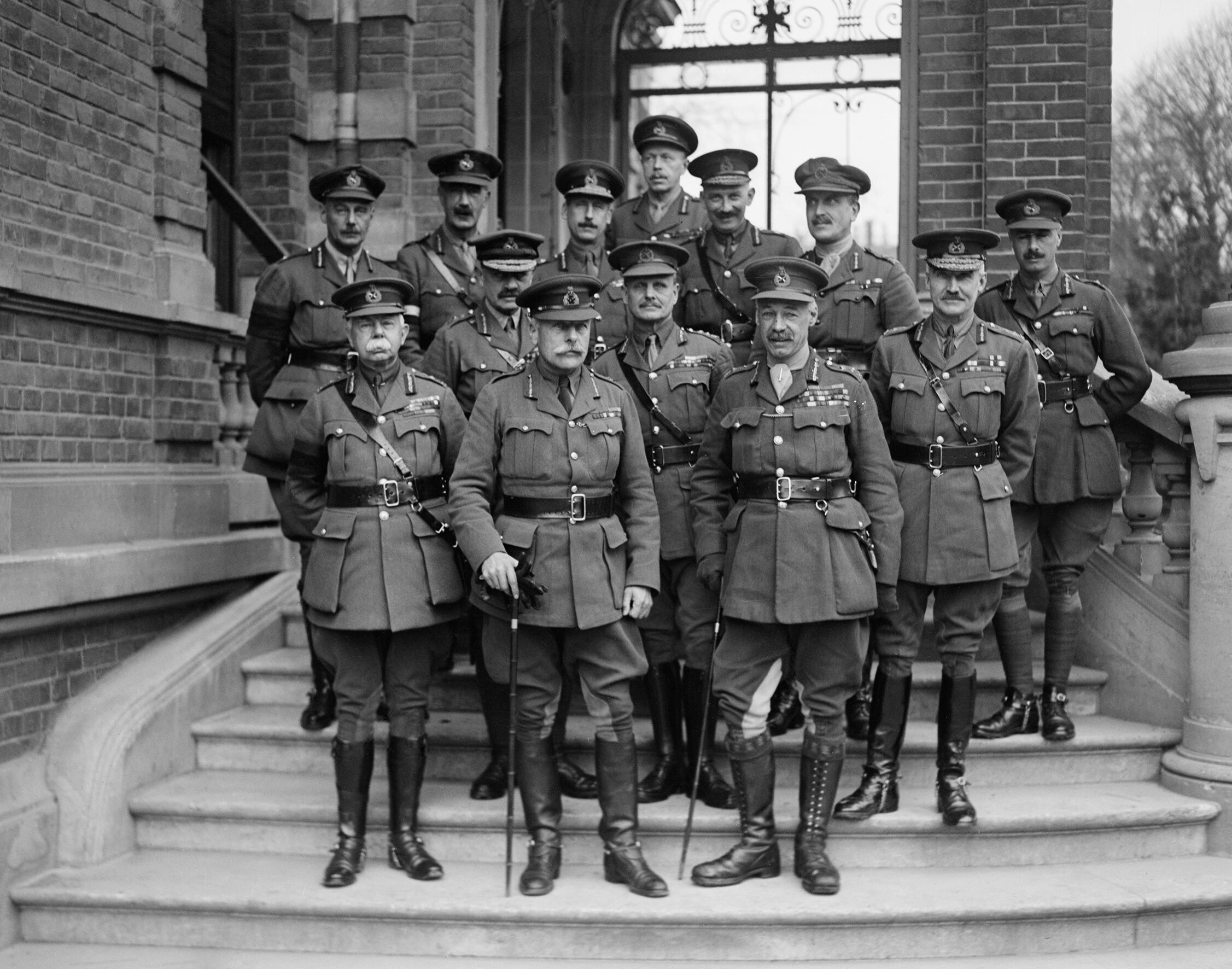
Sir Douglas Haig with his army commanders and their chiefs of staff, November 1918. Front row, left to right: Sir Herbert Plumer, Sir Douglas Haig, Sir Henry Rawlinson. Middle row, left to right: Sir Julian Byng, Sir William Birdwood, Sir Henry Horne. Back row, left to right: Sir Herbert Lawrence, Sir Charles Kavanagh, Brudenell White, Percy, Louis Vaughan, Archibald Montgomery-Massingberd, Hastings Anderson.

Anderson was promoted to captain on 18 December 1899, as he left for South Africa and the Second Boer War. Serving first in a staff position in 1900 as deputy assistant adjutant general on the staff of the military governor in Johannesburg, he returned to his regiment to become adjutant of the 2nd Battalion on 21 April 1901. The battalion served in South Africa throughout the war, which ended in May 1902. Anderson returned home with other officers and men of the battalion on the SS St. Andrew leaving Cape Town in early October, and was subsequently stationed at Aldershot.

He was appointed as a GSO2 at the Staff College, Camberley, in succession to Louis Bols, on 19 February 1914 and was granted the temporary rank of lieutenant colonel while holding this assignment.

Anderson also took part in the First World War, joining the British Expeditionary Force (BEF) and serving with the 8th Division as its first general staff officer, grade 1 (GSO1) from 22 September 1914. In June 1915 he was made a brevet colonel. From October 1915, after being made a temporary brigadier general, he was brigadier general, general staff (BGGS) with the XI Corps, then with the XV Corps and finally with the First Army of the BEF. In June 1915 he was promoted to brevet lieutenant colonel, and brevet colonel in June 1916. In February 1917 he was promoted to the temporary rank of major general and succeeded Major General George Barrow as major general, general staff (MGGS) of the First Army. As MGGS he was, effectively, chief of staff of the First Army, commanded by General Sir Henry Horne throughout Anderson's service with it, and it was his task to prepare for the assault on Vimy Ridge in April 1917. In June 1918 his rank of major general became substantive.

After the war, Anderson became commandant at the Staff College at Camberley from March 1919 until May 1922 when he moved to army headquarters in India. He was appointed General Officer Commanding Baluchistan District in 1924 and became Quartermaster-General to the Forces in 1927, when he was promoted to lieutenant general in March that year. He was also colonel of the Cheshire Regiment from December 1928, when he took over from Major General Sir Edward Graham, until 1930.

Anderson died on 11 December 1930.

== Family ==
Anderson was the elder brother of Admiral Sir David Murray Anderson. He married Eileen Hamilton in 1910; they had no children.

== Bibliography ==
- Outline of the development of the British Army: Up to the commencement of the Great War, 1914 Notes for four lectures delivered at the Staff College by Lieutenant General Sir Hastings Anderson

Military offices
Preceded by College closed during the war (Post last held by Launcelot Kiggell)	Commandant of the Staff College, Camberley; 1919–1922	Succeeded by Edmund Ironside
Preceded by Sir Walter Campbell	Quartermaster-General to the Forces; 1927–1930	Succeeded by Sir Felix Ready
Honorary titles
Preceded by Sir Edward Graham	Colonel of the Cheshire Regiment; 1928–1930	Succeeded by Arthur Crookenden
