= Louis Vaughan =

British Indian Army military officer

Sir Louis Vaughan KCB KBE DSO
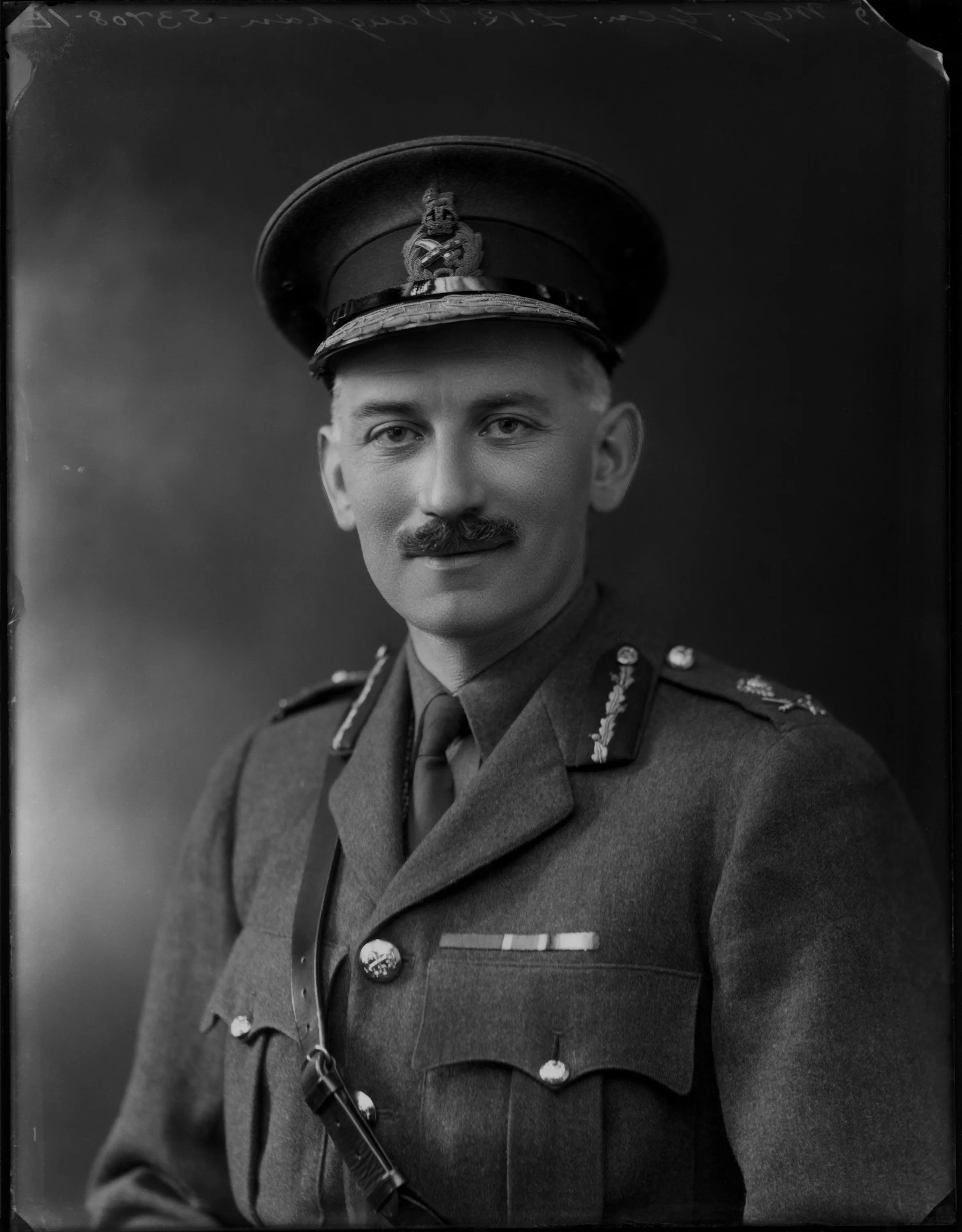
- Vaughan in 1919
- Born: Louis Ridley Vaughan; 7 August 1875
- Died: 7 December 1942 (aged 67); Broadmead, Folkestone, England
- Military career
- Allegiance: United Kingdom
- Branch: British Indian Army
- Service years: 1895–1928
- Rank: Lieutenant General
- Commands: Rawalpindi District (1925–26); Central Provinces and Berar District (1923–24); Staff College, Quetta (1919–23)
- Conflicts: First World War; Third Anglo-Afghan War
- Awards: Knight Commander of the Order of the Bath; Knight Commander of the Order of the British Empire; Distinguished Service Order; Mentioned in Despatches (10); Legion of Honour (France); Croix de guerre (France)

Lieutenant General Sir Louis Ridley Vaughan, KCB, KBE, DSO (7 August 1875 – 7 December 1942) was a British Indian Army staff officer and First World War general. During the First World War, he served on the Western Front, and was chief of staff to General Sir Julian Byng, commander of the Third Army from May 1917 until the end of the war. After the war, he served in the Third Anglo-Afghan War of 1919, and then held several army positions in India until his retirement in 1928. He died in 1942 at the age of 67.

== Early life ==
Louis Ridley Vaughan was born on 7 August 1875. He was the second son of Cedric Vaughan, a Justice of the Peace in Millom, Cumberland. Louis Vaughan was educated at Uppingham School and the Royal Military College at Sandhurst, entering the army in 1895.

== Early army career ==
Vaughan entered the Indian Army in December 1896 and was made captain in 1904, having served in the 78th Moplah Rifles. He transferred to the 113th Infantry in July 1907 when the 78th Moplah Rifles was disbanded. He attended the Staff College, Camberley from 1908 to 1910, and served as a General Staff Officer (GSO) Grade 3, in India from 1910 to 1912. He served in the War Office from 1912 to 1914 (GSO 2nd Grade), and was promoted to major in 1913, by then having transferred to the 7th Gurkha Rifles. Vaughan married Emilie Kate Desmond Deane on 16 April 1913.

== First World War ==
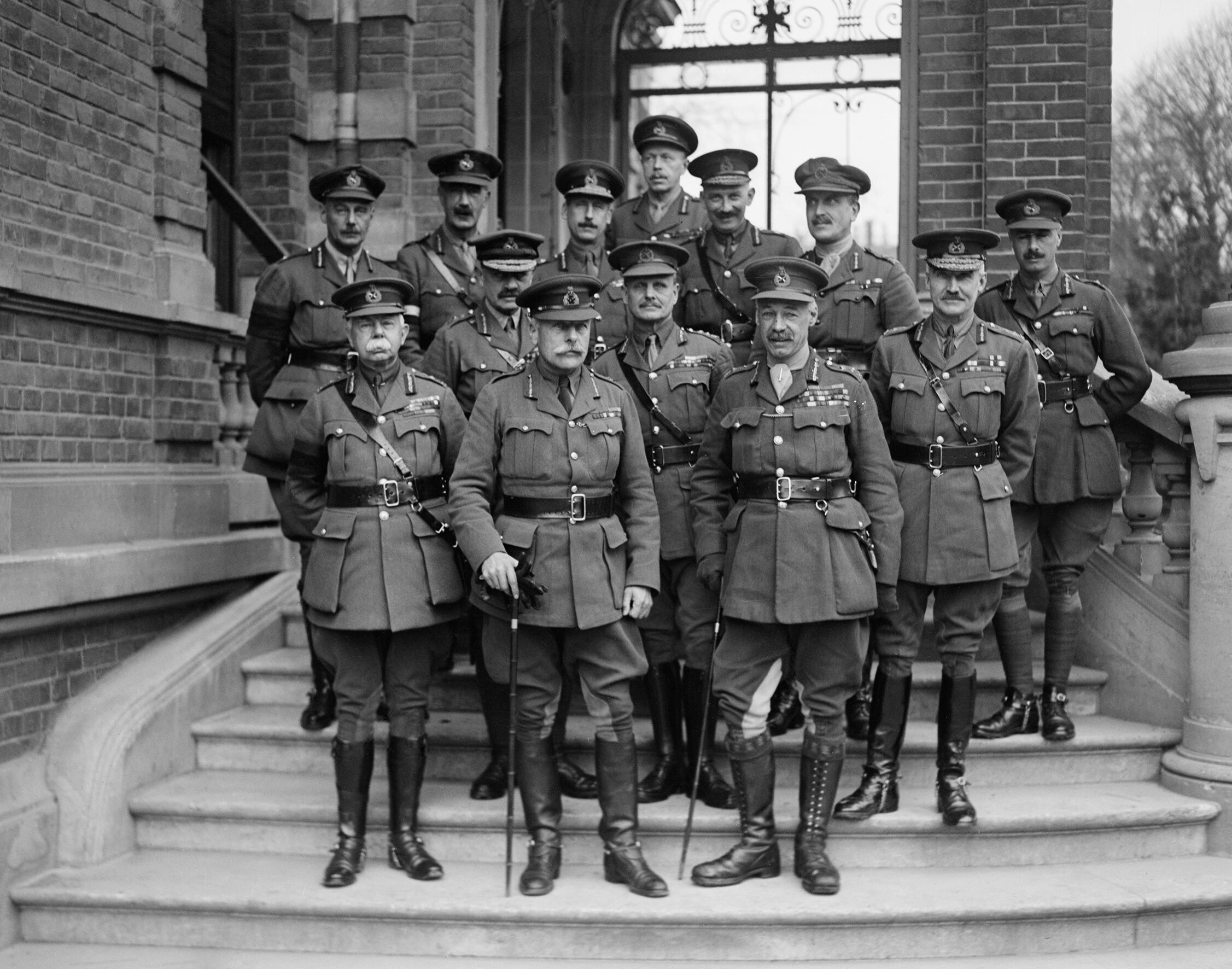
Sir Douglas Haig with his army commanders and their chiefs of staff, November 1918. Front row, left to right: Sir Herbert Plumer, Sir Douglas Haig, Sir Henry Rawlinson. Middle row, left to right: Sir Julian Byng, Sir William Birdwood, Sir Henry Horne. Back row, left to right: Sir Herbert Lawrence, Sir Charles Kavanagh, Brudenell White, Percy, Louis Vaughan, Archibald Montgomery-Massingberd, Hastings Anderson.

Vaughan was on active service as a staff officer from 1914 to 1918, and was mentioned in despatches nine times throughout the war. He was GSO Grade 2 in 1914, and GSO Grade 1 of the 2nd Division in February 1915, which saw him raised to the temporary rank of lieutenant colonel while so employed. Following this was a series of temporary (brevet) promotions, including temporary brigadier general in April 1916, and temporary major general in May 1917. Taking over from Major General Louis Bols, he was effectively chief of staff to General Sir Julian Byng, commander of the Third Army from May 1917 until the end of the war. He was made a substantive major general in 1919.

Vaughan's brother, Percy Cecil Vaughan, who was a London solicitor pre-war, was killed at Ypres in September 1917.

In his 1920 book The Realities of War, the British war correspondent Sir Philip Gibbs described Vaughan as: "That charming man, with his professional manner, sweetness of speech, gentleness of voice and gesture, like an Oxford Don analysing the war correspondence of Xenophon." Vaughan was nicknamed 'Father' by the troops that served under him. John Bourne, of the University of Birmingham's Centre for First World War Studies, who has researched the nicknames given to British Army generals in the First World War, attributes to this nickname a priestly meaning, rather than any patriarchal meaning.

== Post-war career ==
After the First World War, Vaughan, whose rank of major general was made permanent in January 1919, served in the Third Anglo-Afghan War from July to September 1919, commanding the fourth of the eight war divisions that were deployed. He was mentioned in despatches and received a campaign medal and clasp. He was then Commandant of Staff College in Quetta, India, from 1919 to 1923, when he relinquished command. Following that, he was General Officer Commanding (GOC) of two command areas in India: the Central Provinces and Berar District (1923 to 1924), and Rawalpindi District (1925 to 1926). He relinquished command of the latter in January 1927. He was made a substantive lieutenant general in 1926, and retired in 1928.

In August 1930, Vaughan was the representative of General Byng (now Viscount Byng of Vimy) at the unveiling of the Cambrai Memorial.

Vaughan died in 1942 at his home in Broadmead, Folkestone, at the age of 67.
