= Edward Graham (British Army officer) =

British Army general (1859–1951)

Major-General Sir Edward Graham KCB KCMG
- Born: Edward Ritchie Coryton Graham; 7 November 1858; Alipore, Calcutta
- Died: 29 January 1951 (aged 92); Thornbury, Devon, England
- Military career
- Allegiance: United Kingdom
- Branch: British Army
- Rank: Major-General
- Commands: 8th Infantry Brigade; South Midland Division
- Conflicts: First World War
- Awards: Knight Commander of the Order of the Bath; Knight Commander of the Order of St Michael and St George

Major-General Sir Edward Ritchie Coryton Graham KCB KCMG (7 November 1858 − 29 January 1951) was a British Army officer.

== Biography ==
Educated at Eton College and the Royal Military College, Sandhurst, Graham was commissioned into the Cheshire Regiment in 1878 and became an adjutant in July 1884. He was promoted to captain in September 1885, attended the Staff College, Camberley from 1891 to 1892, and was granted the rank of major in October 1894.

He saw action as an assistant provost marshal from February 1900 and later an assistant adjutant general in South Africa during the Second Boer War.

He was promoted to colonel and succeeded Colonel Frederick Robb as an assistant adjutant general at the War Office in January 1905. He became a temporary brigadier general and became commander of the 8th Infantry Brigade in December 1908 and, made a major general in February 1912, was general officer commanding of the South Midland Division, taking over from Major General John Keir, in July 1914 before being replaced in August.

He was appointed a Knight Commander of the Order of the Bath (KCB) in the 1915 Birthday Honours. He then served as a Deputy Adjutant General for the remainder of the war.

He was colonel of the Cheshire Regiment from April 1914 to 1928.

Military offices
| Preceded by John Keir | GOC South Midland Division; July 1914 – August 1914 | Succeeded by Henry Heath |
Honorary titles
| Preceded by William Henry Ralston | Colonel of the Cheshire Regiment; 1914−1928 | Succeeded by Sir Hastings Anderson |
