= James Humphrey Walwyn =

Rear Admiral James Humphrey Walwyn CB OBE (21 August 1913 – 24 February 1986) was a British officer in the Royal Navy who served during the Second World War.

Walwyn was born in London into a prominent Welsh family, the son of Vice-Admiral Sir Humphrey Thomas Walwyn. He was educated at the Royal Naval College in Dartmouth, Devon.

Walwyn served as aide-de-camp in 1936–37 to his father, who was Governor of Newfoundland. During the Second World War, he served on HMS Renown (1939–41) and HMS Newcastle (1943–44). He was later on the staff of the Home Fleet (1945–47), Naval Staff College (1949) and the Admiralty (1948–50), and was Director of Royal Navy Tactical School (1958–59). He commanded HMS Chevron (1951–52) and was captain of the Inshore Flotilla in the Mediterranean Sea (1956–58). He continued to serve in the Mediterranean until his retirement in 1965.

He was appointed an Officer of the Order of the British Empire (OBE) in the 1944 Birthday Honours and a Companion of the Order of the Bath (CB) in the 1964 New Year Honours.

In 1945, Walwyn married Pamela Flora Bell, daughter of Surgeon Captain Kenelm Digby Bell. They had one son, Humphrey Stewart Walwyn (born 1948), who was head of BBC Records; and two daughters, Victoria Lindsay Walwyn (born 1951) and Susan Mary (born 1958).

He died in Westminster, aged 72.
