= David Anderson (British Army officer) =

British Army general (1821–1909)

General David Anderson
- Born: 12 August 1821
- Died: 7 October 1909 (aged 88)
- Relatives: Lieutenant General Sir Hastings Anderson (son); Admiral Sir David Murray Anderson (son)
- Military career
- Allegiance: United Kingdom
- Branch: British Army
- Service years: 1838–1888
- Rank: General
- Commands: Royal Military College, Sandhurst
- Conflicts: North West Frontier

General David Anderson (12 August 1821 – 7 October 1909) was a British Army officer who served as the last Governor of the Royal Military College, Sandhurst, before the post was merged with that of Commandant of the college.

== Military career ==
Anderson was commissioned into the British Army in 1838. He served on the North West Frontier of India from 1853 and was decorated, and in 1885 was appointed to command the Aldershot division. He was Governor of the Royal Military College, Sandhurst, from 1886 to 1888, when he was promoted to a full general and retired from the service.

In retirement, Anderson served as Colonel of the Cheshire Regiment, an honorary appointment received on 3 March 1894.

== Family ==
On 18 November 1863, Anderson married his cousin Charlotte Anderson, second daughter of David Anderson of St Germains, Haddingtonshire, and had five children, Lieutenant General Sir Hastings Anderson, Admiral Sir David Murray Anderson, Charlotte Mary Anderson, Eleanor Florence Anderson and Violet Ann Anderson. The sons both married but there were no grandchildren.

Military offices
| Preceded by Sir Richard Taylor | Governor of the Royal Military College, Sandhurst; 1886–1888 | Succeeded by Edward Clive |
