= HMS Spenser =

Destroyer of the Royal Navy

History

United Kingdom
- Name: HMS Spenser
- Ordered: April 1916
- Builder: John I. Thornycroft & Company
- Laid down: 9 October 1916
- Launched: 22 September 1917
- Commissioned: 12 December 1917
- Fate: Sold for scrap 19 August 1936

General characteristics
- Class & type: Thornycroft type destroyer leader
- Displacement: 1,554 long tons (1,579 t) (standard); 2,009 long tons (2,041 t) (full load)
- Length: 329 ft (100 m) o/a; 318 ft 3 in (97.00 m) pp
- Beam: 31 ft 6 in (9.60 m)
- Draught: 12 ft 3 in (3.73 m)
- Installed power: 40,000 shp (30,000 kW)
- Propulsion: 2 × Brown-Curtiss single reduction steam turbines; 4 × Yarrow boilers; 2 × shafts
- Speed: 36.5 knots (67.6 km/h; 42.0 mph)
- Capacity: 500 short tons (450 t) fuel oil
- Complement: 164
- Armament: 5 × BL 4.7 in (120 mm) Mark I gun, 1 × QF 3 inch 20 cwt anti-aircraft gun, 6 × 21-inch (533 mm) torpedo tubes (2 × 3)

HMS Spenser was a Thornycroft type flotilla leader of the British Royal Navy. She was built by J I Thornycroft from 1916 to 1917 as the lead ship of her class, launching in September 1917 and completing in December that year.

Spenser served in the Harwich Force during the rest of the First World War and in the Baltic during the British intervention in the Russian Civil War in 1919. After service at home and in the Mediterranean, she went into reserve in 1925 and was sold for scrap in 1936.

== Design and construction ==
The Thornycroft type or Shakespeare-class leaders, were like the similar and contemporary Admiralty type (also known as the Scott class) were designed to meet a requirement from Admiral Sir John Jellicoe, commander of the Grand Fleet, for a large, fast and heavily armed flotilla leader to match and outclass rumoured large German destroyers.

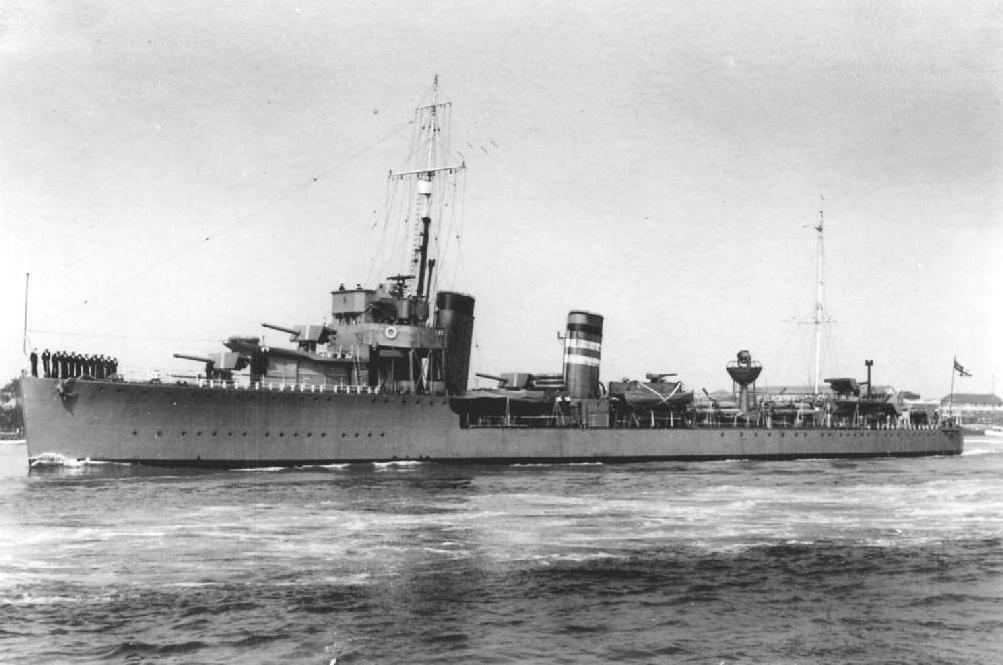
Sister ship HMS Keppel

The ships had a length of 329 ft 1 in (100.30 m) overall, 325 feet 3 inches (99.14 m) at the waterline and 318 ft 3 in (97.00 m) between perpendiculars, with a beam of 31 ft 6 in (9.60 m) and a draught of 12 ft 6 in (3.81 m). Design displacement was 1,530 long tons (1,550 t) normal and 1,900 long tons (1,900 t) full load. (Note: Conway's gives a legend displacement of 1,554 long tons (1,579 t) and a full load displacement of 2,009 long tons (2,041 t), while Lenton gives a normal displacement of 1,480 long tons (1,500 t) and a full load displacement of 2,080 long tons (2,110 t).) The ship's machinery consisted of four Yarrow boilers that fed steam at 250 pounds per square inch (1,700 kPa) to two sets of Brown-Curtis single-reduction geared-steam turbines, rated at 40,000 shaft horsepower (30,000 kW). This gave a design speed of 36.5 knots (67.6 km/h; 42.0 mph) light, which corresponded to about 32.5 knots (60.2 km/h; 37.4 mph) at full load. During sea trials, Spenser recorded a speed of 37.765 knots (69.941 km/h; 43.459 mph). Up to 500 tons of oil fuel could be carried, giving a range of 5,000 nautical miles (9,300 km; 5,800 mi) at 15 knots (28 km/h; 17 mph).

The class had a main gun armament consisted of five 4.7 in (120 mm)/45 calibre BL Mark I guns, (Note: In British practice, BL (Breech Loading) indicated that a separate, bagged, charge was used.) on CP VI mountings capable of elevating to 30 degrees, arranged in two superfiring pairs fore and aft of the superstructure with the remaining gun positioned on a platform between the funnels. Shakespeare's anti-aircraft armament consisted of a single 3 in (76 mm) gun on a platform abaft the rear funnel. Torpedo armament consisted of two triple mounts for 21-inch (533 mm) torpedo tubes between the 3-inch AA gun and the rear pair of 4.7-inch guns. Four depth charges were carried.

The first two examples of Thornycroft's new large leader, Shakespeare and Spenser, were ordered in April 1916. A third was ordered in April 1917 and four more in April 1918. Spenser, named for the poet Edmund Spenser, author of The Faerie Queene, was laid down on 9 October 1917, was launched on 22 September 1917 and commissioned on 12 December that year.

== Service ==
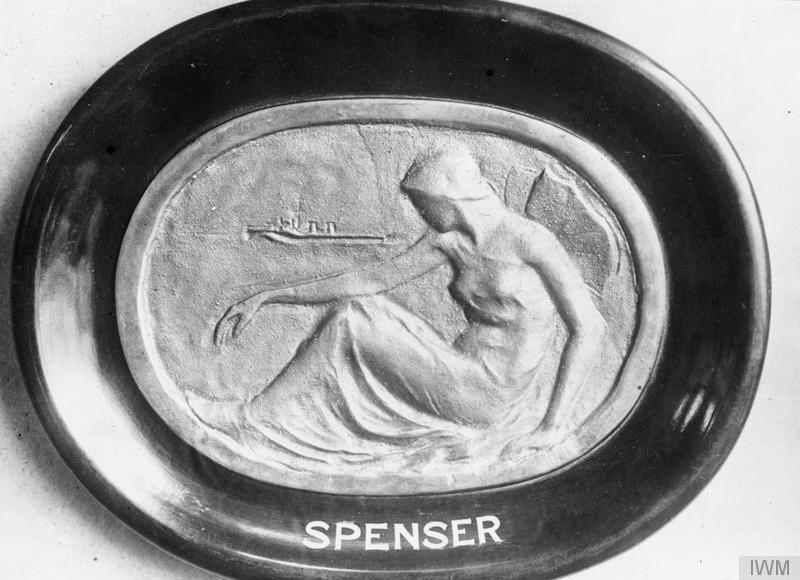
Spenser's ship's badge

Spenser joined the 10th Destroyer Flotilla of the Harwich Force on 15 December 1917 as the second in command of four leaders. (Note: The other three were Shakespeare, Nimrod and Valkyrie, which together with the cruiser Undaunted led 24 destroyers.) On 26 January 1918, Spenser collided with a sailing ship, rescuing eight of the sailing ship's crew. On 27 February 1918, Spenser was attacked by a German Zeppelin in the southern part of the North Sea. On 1 August 1918, the Harwich Force took part in an operation against German minesweeping forces. The force would tow six Coastal Motor Boats (CMBs) to the edge of the mined areas in the inner German Bight. From there, the CMBs would proceed over the minefields and search for German minesweepers, which they were to attack with torpedoes. The operation was aborted when they were sighted by a Zeppelin, which dropped bombs that near missed several ships, with Spenser being one of the ships attacked. The operation was repeated on 10–11 August, with Spenser again part of the escort. Air cover was to be provided by flying boats carried on lighters towed behind three of the destroyers, while two more destroyers towed lighters carrying Sopwith Camel fighter aircraft, for use against German Zeppelin airships. When the force reached the minefields, the lack of wind meant that the flying boats could not take off, so the CMBs continued on unescorted, and were subject to sustained attacks by German aircraft, which resulted in three of the CMBs being sunk and the other three being interned in the Netherlands. Meanwhile, the Harwich Force, waiting for the CMBs to return, encountered the German airship L53, and a Camel took off from a lighter towed behind the destroyer Redoubt and shot down L53. On 15 August 1918, Spenser picked up survivors from the leader Scott and Ulleswater, which had been torpedoed by a German submarine off the Dutch coast. Spencer remained a member of the 10th Flotilla at the end of the war on 11 November 1918.

On 21 November and 1 December 1918, Spenser escorted German U-Boats to Harwich so they could surrender. The Royal Navy's destroyer forces were reorganised after the end of the war, with Spenser becoming one of two leaders of the newly established 2nd Destroyer Flotilla, based at Rosyth, and serving as flagship for the Flotilla's Captain (D), in March 1919. In August 1919, the 2nd Destroyer Flotilla, led by Spenser, was deployed to the Baltic Sea as part of the British operations in the Baltic during the Russian Civil War, relieving the 1st Destroyer Flotilla. On the night of 17/18 August, the 2nd Flotilla, including Spenser escorted seven CMBs ona raid on the Red Fleet anchorage at Kronstadt. The CMBs sank the submarine depot ship Pamiat Azova and damaged the battleship Andrei Pervozvanny at the cost of three CMBs sunk. Regular duties of the 2nd Flotilla and Spenser included patrols and shore bombardment against Bolshevik forces. On 27 October, Spenser together with the monitor Erebus, the cruisers Delhi and Dunedin, the leaders Mackay and Shakespeare and four destroyers took part in a bombardment of the Bolshevik-held Krasnaya Gorka fort, in support of an Estonian offensive against Petrograd, as the fort was a key part of the defences for the cite. Despite the support from the Royal Navy, the Bolsheviks kept control of the fort and the Estonian offensive was stopped. This deployment ended in November 1919, with the flotilla returning to British waters.

Spenser was again deployed to the Baltic in June 1920 and in September–October 1921, but by this time hostilities between Britain and the Bolshevik forces had ended. Spenser took part in a Fleet Review at Spithead of the Atlantic Fleet by Dominion leaders on 3 November 1923, and in the Fleet Review by King George V on 26 July 1924. In September 1924, Spenser joined the 3rd Destroyer Flotilla of the Mediterranean Fleet, where she served until May 1925.

Spenser entered reserve at Portsmouth on 6 June 1925. In 1927–1928, as an economy measure, reserve destroyers were transferred to a centralised Maintenance Reserve, with most reserve destroyers having no crews assigned and only undergoing essential repair work. In fact, however, the resources (both manpower and financial) allocated to the uptake of reserve destroyers was inadequate, and their condition deteriorated, so that most of them never returned to active service. Spenser moved from Portsmouth to Chatham in September 1927, remaining in reserve, and from Chatham to Rosyth in April 1933. On 19 August 1936 Spenser was one of a number of old warships transferred to the shipbreaker Thos. W. Ward in exchange for the old ocean liner Majestic, which the Royal Navy wanted as a training ship. Spenser left Rosyth on 30 September that year for scrapping at Inverkeithing.

== Pennant numbers ==
Pennant number	From	To
F90	January 1918	October 1919
D40	November 1919	1936
