= SMS G194 =

Torpedo boat

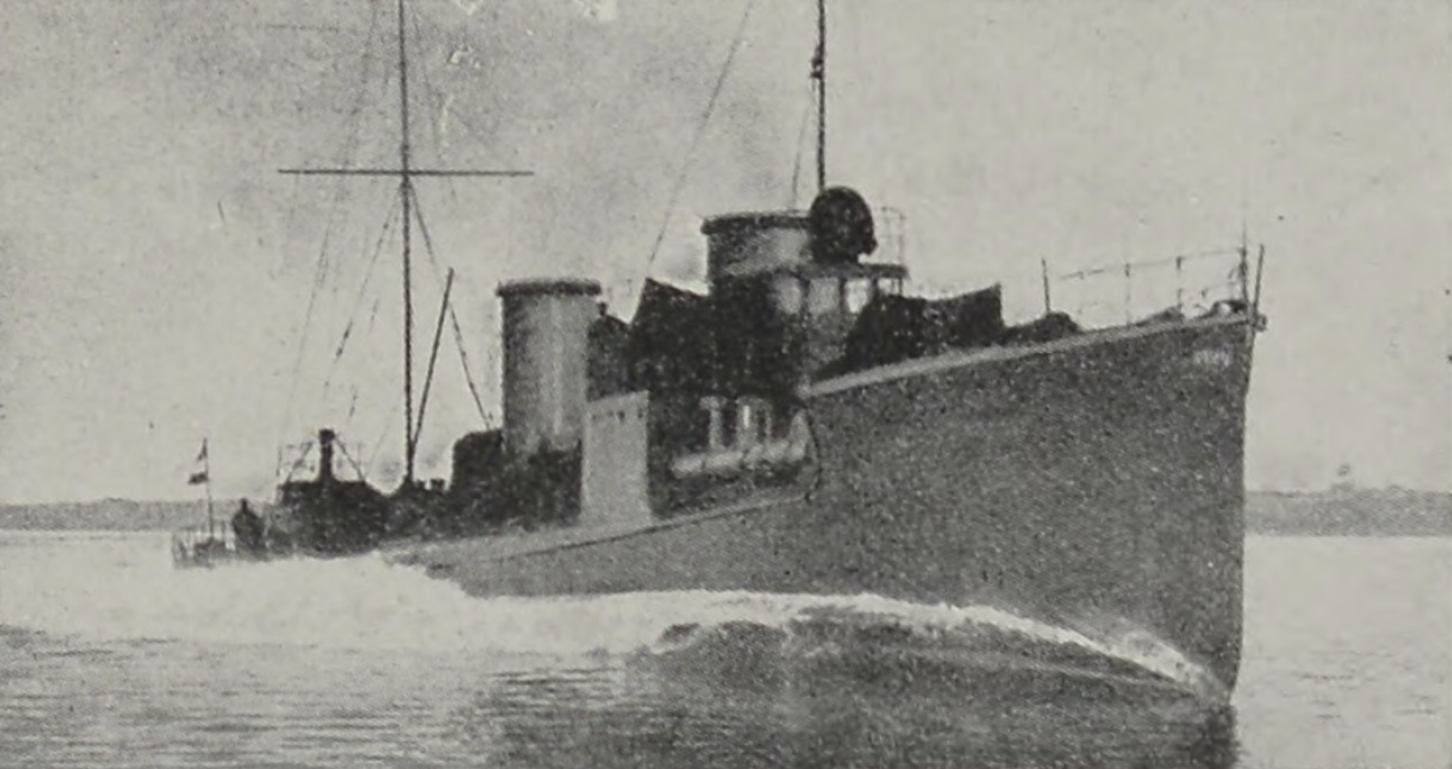
- G194

History

German Empire
- Name: SMS G194
- Builder: Germaniawerft, Kiel
- Launched: 12 January 1911
- Completed: 2 August 1911
- Fate: Rammed by British cruiser Cleopatra, 26 March 1916

General characteristics
- Class & type: S138-class torpedo boat
- Displacement: 660 t (650 long tons) design
- Length: 74.0 m (242 ft 9 in) o/a
- Beam: 7.06 m (23 ft 2 in)
- Draught: 3.1 m (10 ft 2 in)
- Installed power: 18,200 PS (18,000 shp; 13,400 kW)
- Propulsion: 3 × boilers; 2 × steam turbines
- Speed: 32 kn (37 mph; 59 km/h)
- Complement: 84
- Armament: 2× 8.8 cm guns; 4× 50 cm torpedo tubes

SMS G194 (Note: "SMS" stands for "Seiner Majestät Schiff" (transl. His Majesty's Ship)) (Note: The "G" in G194 denoted the shipbuilder who constructed her.) was a S-138-class large torpedo boat of the Imperial German Navy. She was built by the Germaniawerft shipyard at Kiel between 1910 and 1911, and was launched on 25 May 1911, entering service later that year. She served throughout the First World War, taking part in the Battle of Heligoland Bight on 28 August 1914. She was rammed and sunk by the British light cruiser Cleopatra on 26 March 1916.

== Construction and design ==
The Imperial German Navy ordered 12 large torpedo boats (Große Torpedoboote) as part of the fiscal year 1910 shipbuilding programme, with one half-flotilla of six ships ordered from Germaniawerft and the other six ships from AG Vulcan. The two groups of torpedo boats were of basically similar layout but differed slightly in detailed design, with a gradual evolution of design and increase in displacement with each year's orders.

G194 was 74.0 metres (242 ft 9 in) long overall and 73.6 metres (241 ft 6 in) between perpendiculars, with a beam of 7.06 metres (23 ft 2 in) and a draught of 3.1 metres (10 ft 2 in). The ship displaced 660 tonnes (650 long tons) design and 810 tonnes (800 long tons) deep load.

Three coal-fired and one oil-fired water-tube boiler fed steam at a pressure of 18.5 standard atmospheres (272 psi) to two sets of direct-drive steam turbines. The ship's machinery was rated at 18,200 PS (18,000 shp; 13,400 kW) giving a design speed of 32 knots (37 mph; 59 km/h), with members of the class reaching a speed of 33.5 knots (38.6 mph; 62.0 km/h) during sea trials. 145 tons of coal and 76 tons of oil fuel were carried, giving an endurance of 2,590 nautical miles (2,980 mi; 4,800 km) at 12 knots (14 mph; 22 km/h), 1,150 nautical miles (1,320 mi; 2,130 km) at 17 knots (20 mph; 31 km/h) or 420 nautical miles (480 mi; 780 km) at 30 knots (35 mph; 56 km/h).

The ship was armed with two 8.8 cm L/45 guns, (Note: Both Conway's All The World's Fighting Ships and Jane's Fighting Ships claim L/30 guns were fitted.) one on the forecastle and one aft. Four single 50 cm (19.7 in) torpedo tubes were fitted, with two on the ship's beam in the gap between the forecastle and the ship's bridge which were capable of firing straight ahead, one between the ship's two funnels, and one aft of the funnels. The ship had a crew of 84 officers and men.

G194 was laid down at Germaniawerft's Kiel shipyard as Yard number 153 and was launched on 12 January 1911 and completed on 2 August 1911.

== Service ==
On commissioning, G194 joined the 2nd Half Flotilla of the 1st Torpedo Flotilla, and remained part of the 2nd Half Flotilla in 1914.

On 28 August 1914, the British Harwich Force, supported by light cruisers and battlecruisers of the Grand Fleet, carried out a raid towards Heligoland with the intention of destroying patrolling German torpedo boats. The German defensive patrols around Heligoland consisted of one flotilla (the 1st Torpedo Flotilla) of 12 modern torpedo boats forming an outer patrol line about 25 nautical miles (29 mi; 46 km) North and West of Heligoland, with an inner line of older torpedo boats of the 3rd Minesweeping Division at about 12 nautical miles (14 mi; 22 km). Four German light cruisers and another flotilla of torpedo boats (the 5th Torpedo Boat Flotilla) was in the vicinity of Heligoland. G194, a member of the 2nd Half Flotilla of the 1st Torpedo Flotilla, formed part of the outer screen of torpedo boats.

At about 06:00 on 28 August, G194 spotted the periscope of the British submarine E7, one of three submarines deployed as bait to lure the German torpedo boats away from Heligoland. Shortly afterwards E7 fired a torpedo at G194 which missed. (Note: G194 reported that two torpedoes had been fired at her.) G194 reported by radio her encounter with the British submarine to Rear Admiral Leberecht Maass, the commander of the German torpedo boat forces, aboard the cruiser Cöln back at Wilhelmshaven. As a result of this report, the 5th Torpedo Boat Flotilla was ordered out to hunt the hostile submarine.

At 07:57 G194 was fired on by British warships, and while returning fire, turned away to the south east towards Heligoland, pursued by the British destroyers Laurel, Liberty, Lysander and Laertes. The 5th Flotilla and the old torpedo boats of the 3rd Minesweeping Division also came under British fire, and were only saved by the intervention of the German cruisers Stettin and Frauenlob, with the torpedo boats V1, D8 and T111 damaged.

The Torpedo boat V187, leader of the 1st Flotilla, trying to return to Heligoland on hearing gunfire, ran into the midst of the Harwich force and was sunk. The intervention of the supporting British forces resulted in the sinking of the German cruisers Mainz, Cöln and Ariadne. The British light cruiser Arethusa and destroyers Laurel, Laertes and Liberty were badly damaged but safely returned to base. G194 was undamaged.

From 15 to 17 December 1914, the 1st Torpedo Boat Flotilla, including G194, accompanied German battlecruisers during the Raid on Scarborough, Hartlepool and Whitby. On the return journey from the bombardment, the 1st Flotilla sighted the British battleships of the 2nd Battle Squadron, but could not mount a torpedo attack owing to the heavy seas and excessive range to the British ships. In August 1915 the Germans detached a large portion of the High Seas Fleet for operations in the Gulf of Riga in support of the advance of German troops. It was planned to enter the Gulf via the Irbe Strait, defeating any Russian naval forces and mining the entrance to Moon Sound. G194 was deployed in support of these operations. On 23 August 1915, G194, along with G192 and G196, escorted the newly commissioned battlecruiser Lützow from Danzig to Kiel, with the ships arriving at their destination on 24 August.

On 25 March 1916, the British seaplane carrier Vindex, escorted by the Harwich force, launched an air attack against a Zeppelin base believed to be at Hoyer on the coast of Schleswig. The raid was a failure, with the airship base actually at Tondern, and the British destroyer Medusa was rammed by the destroyer Laverock. Forces of the High Seas Fleet went to sea in response to the air raid, and German torpedo boats were ordered to search for Medusa, which had been slowly towed towards home in poor weather, but unknown to the Germans, had later been abandoned. During the night of 25/26 March, G193 and G194 suddenly encountered units of the Harwich force. The light cruiser Cleopatra rammed G194, cutting the torpedo boat in two and sinking her, killing all 93 of G194's crew. In doing so, Cleopatra cut across the bows of the cruiser Undaunted, which rammed Cleopatra, damaging both cruisers.
