= Thornycroft type destroyer leader =

1917 class of British destroyer leaders

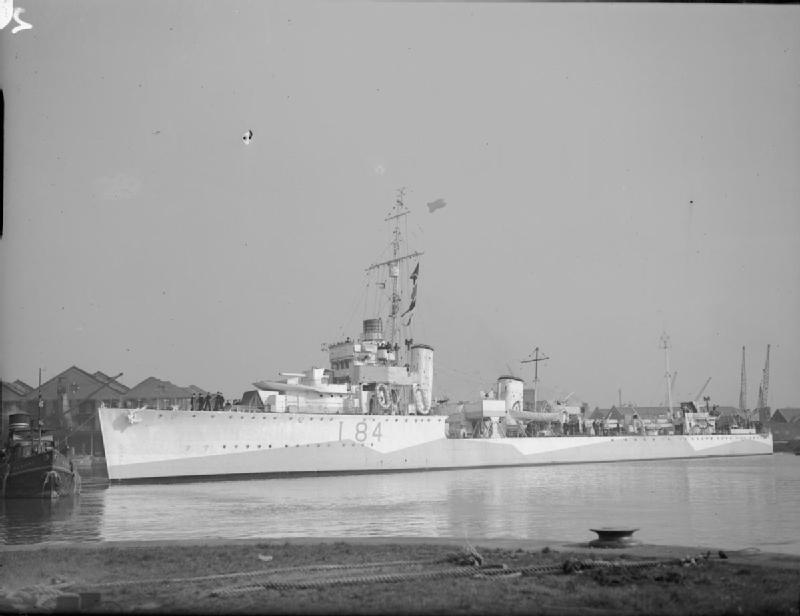
- HMS Keppel

Class overview
- Builders: Thornycroft
- Operators: Royal Navy
- Preceded by: Admiralty V-class leader
- Succeeded by: Admiralty type leader
- Built: 1916–1925
- In commission: 1917–1945
- Planned: 7
- Completed: 5
- Cancelled: 2
- Lost: 1

General characteristics
- Type: Destroyer leader
- Displacement: 1,480 tons standard; 2,009 tons full load
- Length: 329 ft (100 m) o/a
- Beam: 31 ft 6 in (9.60 m)
- Draught: 12 ft 6 in (3.81 m)
- Propulsion: 4 × Yarrow-type boilers; Brown-Curtis single reduction turbines; 2 shafts; 40,000 shp (29,830 kW)
- Speed: 38 kn (70 km/h) (trials); 36 kn (67 km/h) (service)
- Range: 500 tons oil
- Complement: 164
- Armament: 5 × BL 4.7 in (120 mm) Mark I guns; 1 × 12 pdr (3 in) HA Mark VIII; 2 × triple 21 inch (533 mm) torpedo tubes

The Thornycroft type leader or Shakespeare class were a class of five destroyer leaders designed by John I. Thornycroft & Company and built by them at Woolston, Southampton for the Royal Navy towards the end of World War I. They were named after historical naval leaders. Only Shakespeare and Spenser were completed in time for wartime service. The other three were completed after the war, Broke and Keppel after being towed to Royal dockyards for completion, and two further ships – Saunders and Spragge – were cancelled. The function of a leader was to carry the flag staff of a destroyer flotilla, therefore they were enlarged to carry additional crew, offices and signalling equipment, allowing a fifth gun to be carried. These ships were very similar to the Admiralty type leader, but had Thornycroft design characteristics, the most noticeable being the broad, slab-sided funnels.

The design was used as the basis for several ships built for foreign navies in the 1920s.

- Regele Ferdinand-class destroyer built in Italy for the Romanian Navy
- Churruca-class destroyer built in Spain for the Spanish Navy and Argentine Navy
- Mendoza-class destroyer built in Britain for the Argentine Navy

== Ships ==
The first two ships to this design were ordered under the War Emergency Programme, in April 1916:

- HMS Shakespeare; laid down 2 October 1916, launched 7 July 1917 and completed 10 October 1917. Badly damaged by mine in June 1918, sold for breaking up and handed over 2 September 1936.
- HMS Spenser; laid down 9 October 1916, launched 22 September 1917 and completed 12 December 1917. Saw wartime service, sold for breaking up and handed over 29 September 1936.

A third was ordered in April 1917:

- HMS Wallace; laid down 15 August 1917, launched 26 October 1918 and completed 14 February 1919. Converted to a WAIR anti-aircraft escort in 1939. Served mainly on east coast and during the Allied invasion of Sicily. Sold for breaking up 20 March 1945.

Four more were ordered from Thornycroft in April 1918, but with the end of the War the first pair were completed by HM Dockyards and the second pair were cancelled; the second ship was initially named Rooke, but was renamed Broke in April 1921:

- HMS Keppel; launched 23 April 1920, completed 1925 by HM Dockyard Portsmouth. Sold for breaking up July 1945. The ship's bell was saved, and is located adjacent to the cricket pavilion of the Haileybury and Imperial Service College
- HMS Broke; launched 16 September 1920, completed January 1925 by HM Dockyard Pembroke. Sustained damage 8 November 1942 during naval assault upon Algiers during Operation Torch, and foundered the next day.

Two more vessels were ordered at the same time, to be built to this design by Cammell Laird, but it was subsequently decided to build these instead to the Admiralty type flotilla leader design and in the event both were subsequently cancelled:

- HMS Saunders; Cancelled, December 1918.
- HMS Spragge; Cancelled, December 1918.

== See also ==
Media related to Shakespeare class flotilla leader at Wikimedia Commons

- List of destroyers of the Royal Navy
