= Seskar =

Russian island in the Gulf of Finland

Coordinates: 60°02′N 28°22′E

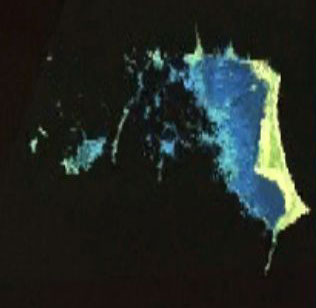

Seskar (Russian: Сескар; Swedish: Seitskär; Finnish: Seiskari), or Siskar, is an island in the Gulf of Finland, part of the Leningrad Oblast of Russia.

== Important Bird Area ==
The island has been designated an Important Bird Area (IBA) by BirdLife International because it supports populations of many species of waterfowl and waders on passage, as well as breeding Arctic herring gulls.

== History ==
The island was an independent municipality of Finland populated by Finns since at least the 16th century. The Seiskari municipality was formed from the Koivisto municipality in 1903. It was part of the province of Viipuri in the South Karelia region. It was ceded to the Soviet Union following the 1940 Moscow Peace Treaty. Prior to the transfer of sovereignty, it was also known as Siskar.

=== Shipwrecks ===
The island has been involved in many shipwrecks over the centuries, including some ships sunk, wrecked or otherwise lost:

- In 1777, the British ship Mercey was wrecked near the island. She was on a voyage from Saint Petersburg to London.
- In 1802, the Russian ship Roman Vasselevitch was wrecked near the island. She was on a voyage from Saint Petersburg to London.
- In 1807, the British ship Nelly was driven ashore on Seskar island. She was on a voyage from London to Saint Petersburg. Nelly was later refloated.
- In 1815, the British ship Graces was wrecked by Seskar. The crew was rescued.
