= HMS Cleopatra (1915) =

Royal Navy C-class light cruiser

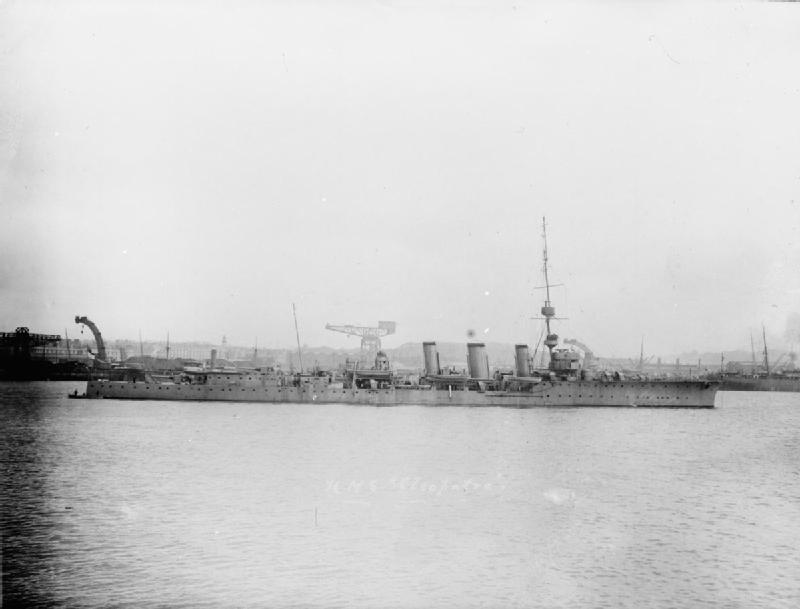
- Cleopatra sometime between 1915 and 1919

History

United Kingdom
- Name: Cleopatra
- Builder: Devonport Dockyard
- Laid down: 26 February 1914
- Launched: 14 January 1915
- Completed: June 1915
- Commissioned: June 1915
- Decommissioned: 1921
- Recommissioned: 1923
- Decommissioned: 1924
- Recommissioned: January 1925
- Decommissioned: December 1926
- Recommissioned: December 1927
- Decommissioned: March 1931
- Identification: Pennant number: 1A (1914); 40 (Jan 18); 88 (Apr 18); P.03 (Nov 19)
- Fate: Sold for scrap, 26 June 1931

General characteristics (as built)
- Class & type: C-class light cruiser
- Displacement: 4,219 long tons (4,287 t)
- Length: 446 ft (135.9 m) (o/a)
- Beam: 41 ft 6 in (12.6 m)
- Draught: 16 ft (4.9 m) (mean)
- Installed power: 8 × Yarrow boilers; 40,000 shp (30,000 kW)
- Propulsion: 2 × shafts; 2 × steam turbines
- Speed: 28.5 knots (52.8 km/h; 32.8 mph)
- Complement: 301
- Armament: 2 × single 6 in (152 mm) guns; 8 × single 4 in (102 mm) guns; 1 × single 6 pdr (2.2 in (57 mm)) AA gun; 2 × twin 21 in (533 mm) torpedo tubes
- Armour: Waterline belt: 1–3 in (25–76 mm); Deck: 1 in (25 mm); Conning tower: 6 in

The fourth HMS Cleopatra was a C-class light cruiser of the Royal Navy that saw service during World War I and the Russian Civil War. She was part of the Caroline group of the C class.

== Design and description ==
The C-class cruisers were intended to escort the fleet and defend it against enemy destroyers attempting to close within torpedo range. Ordered in July–August 1913 as part of the 1913–14 Naval Programme, the Carolines were enlarged and improved versions of the preceding Arethusa-class cruisers. The ships were 446 feet (135.9 m) long overall, with a beam of 41 feet 6 inches (12.6 m) and a mean draught of 16 feet (4.9 m). They displaced 4,219 long tons (4,287 t) at normal load and 4,733 long tons (4,809 t) at deep load.

Cleopatra was powered by four direct-drive Brown-Curtis steam turbines, each driving one propeller shaft using steam generated by eight Yarrow boilers. The turbines produced a total of 40,000 shaft horsepower (30,000 kW) which gave her a speed of 28.5 knots (52.8 km/h; 32.8 mph). The ships carried enough fuel oil to give them a range of 3,680 nautical miles (6,820 km; 4,230 mi) at 18 knots (33 km/h; 21 mph). They had a crew of 301 officers and ratings.

The main armament of the Carolines consisted of two BL six-inch (152 mm) Mk XII guns that were mounted on the centreline in the stern, with one gun superfiring over the rearmost gun. Their secondary armament consisted of eight QF four-inch (102 mm) Mk IV guns, four on each side, one pair forward of the bridge, another pair abaft it on the forecastle deck and the other two pairs one deck lower amidships. For anti-aircraft defence, she was fitted with one QF 13-pounder (3-inch (76 mm)) gun. The ship also mounted two twin, rotating mounts for 21-inch (533 mm) torpedoes, one on each broadside. The Carolines were protected by a waterline belt amidships that ranged in thickness from 1–3 inches (25–76 mm) and a 1-inch (25 mm) deck. The walls of their conning tower were 6 inches thick.

== Construction ==
Constructed by Devonport Dockyard, Cleopatra was laid down on 26 February 1914, launched on 14 January 1915, and completed in June 1915.

== Service history ==
=== World War I ===
Commissioned into service in the Royal Navy in June 1915, Cleopatra was assigned to the 5th Light Cruiser Squadron in Harwich Force, which operated in the North Sea to guard the eastern approaches to the Strait of Dover and English Channel. In 1915, she was fitted with a runway on her forecastle to launch French-made Royal Naval Air Service monoplanes to attack German airships flying over the North Sea, but the aircraft proved unable to achieve the altitude necessary to attack the airships, and the runway had been removed by early 1916. In August 1915, she took part in the hunt in the North Sea for the Imperial German Navy auxiliary cruiser SMS Meteor. In February 1916, she replaced the recently lost light cruiser HMS Arethusa as flagship for Harwich Force's commander, Commodore Reginald Tyrwhitt. She was part of the force covering a Royal Naval Air Service seaplane raid against the Imperial German Navy airship hangars at Tondern, then in northern Germany, on 24 March 1916 and, during the return journey, sighted the German destroyer G 194 ahead of her. She turned toward G 194 and rammed her, cutting the destroyer in half and sinking her immediately, but the maneuver took Cleopatra across the bows of the light cruiser HMS Undaunted, and the two cruisers collided; Cleopatra returned to base with the force despite the damage she suffered in the two collisions, but Undaunted was so badly damaged that it took her four days to reach port.

Cleopatra completed repairs and returned to service in time to take part in Royal Navy operations opposing the Lowestoft Raid – a German naval bombardment of Yarmouth and Lowestoft – on 24–25 April 1916, and was part of the force under Commodore Tyrwhitt that found the German battlecruisers carrying out the raid. She was involved in an engagement with German destroyers in the North Sea on 18 July 1916. On 4 August 1916, she struck a mine off Thornton Ridge off the coast of Belgium, but soon returned to action after repairs.

In January 1917, Cleopatra participated in an unsuccessful operation to attack German destroyers off the Belgian coast. She underwent modernisation during 1917, and in October 1917 joined the other Harwich Force cruisers in a patrol zone to intercept any German attempt to intercept convoys steaming to and from Scandinavia. She was assigned to the 7th Light Cruiser Squadron of the Grand Fleet in August 1918 as squadron flagship, and served in that capacity through the end of World War I in November 1918 and until March 1919.

=== Postwar ===
After leaving the 7th Light Cruiser Squadron in March 1919, Cleopatra rejoined the 2nd Light Cruiser Squadron in April 1919 and served in the Baltic Sea from 1919 to 1920 during the British campaign there against Bolshevik and German forces during the Russian Civil War. After returning to the United Kingdom, she recommissioned in October 1920 to serve in the Atlantic Fleet. She was decommissioned in 1921 and placed in the Nore Reserve.

Cleopatra recommissioned in 1923 to serve in the 3rd Light Cruiser Squadron, then entered the Devonport Reserve in 1924. She again recommissioned in January 1925 and was assigned to the 2nd Light Cruiser Squadron in the Atlantic Fleet, serving until decommissioned again in December 1926 and placed under dockyard control. In December 1927, she commissioned into the Nore Reserve, and was its flagship from September 1928 to March 1931. While in the Nore Reserve, she transported troops to the Mediterranean in October 1928 and to China in 1929. In March 1931, she was decommissioned and placed under dockyard control at Chatham Dockyard.

== Disposal ==
Cleopatra was sold on 26 June 1931 to Hughes Bolckow of Blyth, Northumberland, for scrapping.
