= 8th Submarine Flotilla =

- Active: 1912–15 January 1919; 1939-1945
- Country: United Kingdom
- Branch: Royal Navy
- Size: Flotilla
- Part of: Home Fleet 1912-1919; Mediterranean, Indian Ocean and Pacific based commands 1939-1945

The 8th Submarine Flotilla was a flotilla of the British Royal Navy consisting of submarines and their supporting depot ships and destroyers. It was established as part of the Home Fleet in 1912. The flotilla brought together the newer, longer range 'overseas' submarines for the purpose of carrying out offensive operations. Composition of the flotilla varied over time. It was disestablished in 1919.

The flotilla was re-established in 1939 for service in the Second World War. It was disestablished again after the close of hostilities.

== History ==
=== First World War ===
==== Organisation in August 1914 ====
On 5 August 1914, the Eighth Submarine Flotilla was based at its war station at Harwich and was constituted as follows:

Submarines

- HMS D.2
- HMS D.3
- HMS D.4
- HMS D.5
- HMS D.6
- HMS D.7
- HMS D.8
- HMS E.1
- HMS E.2
- HMS E.3
- HMS E.4
- HMS E.5
- HMS E.6
- HMS E.7
- HMS E.8
- HMS E.9

Depot ships

- HMS Maidstone
- HMS Adamant

Attached Destroyers

- HMS Lurcher
- HMS Firedrake

HMS D.1 was also notionally part of the flotilla, but was transferred to the Dover Patrol when war broke out. She re-joined the Flotilla on 23 August 1914

==== War Service 1914 ====
The Flotilla carried out patrols in the Heligoland Bight and in the Kattegat. It participated in the First Battle of Heligoland and the Cuxhaven Raid and covered the passage of the British Expeditionary Force to France. The development of a satellite base at Yarmouth was commenced. Notable events and organisational changes are as follows:

HMS E.10 joined the Flotilla on completion of sea trials, 27 August

E.9 torpedoed and sank the Scout cruiser Hela south of Heligoland on 13 September

HMS E.11 joined the Flotilla on completion of sea trials, 2 October

E.9 torpedoed and sank the high seas torpedo boat S.116 on 6 October off the Ems estuary

HMS E.12 joined the Flotilla on completion of sea trials, 17 October

E.1 and E.9 entered the Baltic Sea for detached service with the Russian Baltic Fleet, 17-18 October

E.3 was sunk by a torpedo fired by U-27 of the Ems, 18 October

D.5 was sunk by a mine off Yarmouth, 3 November

HMS E.15 joined the Flotilla on completion of sea trials, 5 November

HMS C.34 was temporarily attached to the Flotilla from the Dover Patrol, 17 November until 20 December

D.2 was lost on a patrol to a billet off Heligoland, cause and location of loss unknown, on or after 25 November

HMS S.1 joined the Flotilla from the Dover Patrol, 2 December

HMS C.16 was temporarily attached to the Flotilla from the Dover Patrol, 2 to 16 December

Archimède was temporarily attached to the Flotilla from the French 3e Escadrille, 2 to 16 December

HMS E.13 joined the Flotilla on completion of sea trials, 15 December

==== Organisation in February 1916 ====
As at 1 February 1916, the flotilla had grown in size and was based at both Harwich and Yarmouth. It was constituted as follows:

Submarines

- HMS D.1
- HMS D.3
- HMS D.4
- HMS D.6
- HMS D.7
- HMS D.8
- HMS E.4
- HMS E.5
- HMS E.16
- HMS E.22
- HMS E.23
- HMS E.24
- HMS E.26
- HMS E.29
- HMS E.31
- HMS E.41
- HMS H.5
- HMS H.7
- HMS H.8
- HMS H.9
- HMS H.10

Depot ships

- HMS Maidstone
- HMS Alecto

Attached Destroyers

- HMS Lurcher
- HMS Firedrake

HMS E.1, HMS E.8, HMS E.9, HMS E.18 and HMS E.19 were notionally still in the flotilla, but were all on detached service with the Russian Baltic Fleet.

==== Flotilla re-constituted August 1916 ====
Vessels based at Harwich were transferred to the re-established 9th Submarine Flotilla in August 1916 and only those submarines based at Yarmouth remained in 8th Flotilla

==== Organisation in October 1916 ====
As at 1 October 1916 the flotilla was based at Yarmouth and formed part of the Harwich Force:

Submarines

- HMS F.1
- HMS F.3
- HMS H.5
- HMS H.7
- HMS H.8
- HMS H.9
- HMS H.10
- HMS V.1
- HMS V.2
- HMS V.3
- HMS V.4

Depot ship

- HMS Alecto

==== Organisation in January 1919 ====
As at 1 January 1919 the flotilla remained part of the Harwich Force, but following the suspension of hostilities had moved to Dover and was constituted as follows:

Submarines

- HMS H.21
- HMS H.22
- HMS H.28
- HMS H.29
- HMS H.30

Depot ship

- HMS Alecto

=== Second World War ===
==== September 1939 to August 1944 ====
Service summary:

Re-established on the East Indies Station at Colombo September 1939, disestablished again May 1940. 4 'O' Class submarines.

Re-established for the North Atlantic Command at Gibraltar December 1940, moving to Algiers December 1943.

Moved to the Eastern Fleet February 1944.

==== Southwest Pacific August 1944 to April 1945 ====
The Flotilla was moved to Fremantle in August 1944, for service with the U.S. 7th Fleet. Maidstone arrived on 4 September 1944 and the submarines arrived throughout the month. The Flotilla was constituted as follows:

Submarines

- HMS Telemachus
- HMS Tantivy
- HMS Tantalus
- HMS Spiteful
- HMS Sea Rover
- HMS Sturdy
- HMS Stoic
- HMS Sirdar
- HMS Storm
- HNLMS Zwaardvisch
- HNLMS O 19

Depot ship

- HMS Maidstone

The Flotilla carried out patrols against both enemy warships and commerce in the South West Pacific. Principal events during 1944 in addition to the sinking of three merchant ships and 59 small coastal craft were as follows:

Zwaardvisch torpedoed and sank U-168, 6 October 1944

Zwaardvisch torpedoed and sank the Japanese minelayer Itsukushima, 17 October 1944

Stoic returned home for refit and was replaced by HMS Spirit from 2nd Submarine Flotilla in December

Operations continued from Fremantle in 1945, but up to the end of April enemy vessels proved hard to find. Principal events in addition to the sinking of one merchant ship, a small armed decoy and 29 small coastal craft were as follows:

Tantivy returned home for refit and was replaced by HMS Tradewind in January

Sirdar and Spirit returned home for refit and were replaced by HMS Tudor, HMS Stygian and HMS Spark in March

Stygian drove the Japanese Special Minesweeper No. 104 ashore with gunfire on Bali on 13 April

==== Philippines April to September 1945 ====
Maidstone left Fremantle on 19 April. The Flotilla was relocated to a new base at Subic Bay in the Philippines. Maidstone arrived on 20 May. The Flotilla was reconstituted there as follows:

Submarines

- HMS Stygian
- HMS Supreme
- HMS Selene
- HMS Solent
- HMS Sleuth
- HMS Sea Scout
- HMS Spark

Depot ship

- HMS Maidstone

== Commanding Officers ==
	Rank	Name	Term	Notes
Officers Commanding, 8th Submarine Flotilla
1	Captain (S)	Frank Brandt	15 October 1912 - 1 September 1913	Appointed for command of Submarine Flotilla
2	Captain (S)	Arthur Kipling Waistell	1 September 1913 - 9 August 1916	Appointed for command of Submarine Flotilla
3	Commander (S)	Sir Leonard Pius Vavasour, Baronet	9 August 1916 - 14 November 1918	Appointed for command of Submarine Flotilla
4	Commander (S)	Robert Ross Turner	14 November 1918 - 15 January 1919	Appointed for command of Submarine Flotilla
