= HMS D3 =

Submarine of the Royal Navy

History

United Kingdom
- Name: HMS D3
- Builder: Vickers Armstrong, Barrow-in-Furness
- Laid down: 15 March 1910
- Launched: 17 October 1910
- Commissioned: 30 August 1911
- Fate: Sunk 12 March 1918

General characteristics
- Class & type: D-class submarine
- Displacement: Surfaced: 483 tons / Submerged: 595 tons
- Length: 163.0 ft (49.7 m) (oa)
- Beam: 13.6 ft (4.1 m) (oa)
- Propulsion: 550 hp electric 1750 hp diesel twin screws
- Speed: Surfaced:14.0 kn / Dived: 10.0 (design) 9.0 (service)
- Range: Surface: 2500 nmi at 10 kn / Submerged:45 nmi at 5 knots
- Complement: 25
- Armament: 3x18 in (46 cm) torpedo tubes (2 bow, 1 stern)

HMS D3 was a D-class submarine of the British Royal Navy, one of eight of this class. D3 was built by Vickers at their Barrow-in-Furness works in 1910–1911, being launched on 17 October 1910 and completed on 30 August 1911.

D3 was active during the First World War, carrying out patrols in the North Sea and German Bight in the early years of the war, before transferring to anti-submarine patrols off Ireland in 1917 and to operations in the English Channel in 1918. D3 was sunk in a friendly fire incident by the French airship AT-0 off Dieppe on 12 March 1918, with the loss of all her crew.

== Description ==
The D-class submarines were designed as improved and enlarged versions of the preceding C class, with diesel engines replacing the dangerous petrol engines used earlier. D3 and subsequent boats were slightly larger than the earlier boats. They had a length of 164 feet 7 inches (50.2 m) overall, a beam of 20 feet 5 inches (6.2 m) and a mean draught of 11 feet 5 inches (3.5 m). They displaced 495 long tons (503 t) on the surface and 620 long tons (630 t) submerged. The D-class submarines had a crew of 25 officers and ratings and were the first to adopt saddle tanks.

For surface running, the boats were powered by two 600-brake-horsepower (447 kW) diesels, each driving one propeller shaft. When submerged each propeller was driven by a 275-horsepower (205 kW) electric motor. They could reach 14 knots (26 km/h; 16 mph) on the surface and 9 knots (17 km/h; 10 mph) underwater. On the surface, the D class had a range of 2,500 nautical miles (4,600 km; 2,900 mi) at 10 knots (19 km/h; 12 mph).

The boats were armed with three 18-inch (45 cm) torpedo tubes, two in the bow and one in the stern. They carried one reload for each tube, a total of six torpedoes.

== Construction and career ==
D3 was laid down on 15 March 1910 by Vickers at their Barrow shipyard, was launched on 17 October 1910 and completed on 30 August 1911.

In February 1913, D3 was listed as being part of the 8th Submarine Flotilla. D3 remained part of the 8th Flotilla, based at Portsmouth in July 1914.

=== First World War ===
The 8th Flotilla, consisting of modern submarines of the D- and E-class, was assigned the wartime role of offensive operations in the North Sea, operating from Harwich. As the risk of war with Germany increased, the British Fleet was mobilised on 1 August, and on 5 August, the day after the United Kingdom declared war on Germany and entered the First World War, D3 was at the 8th Flotilla's base at Harwich. D3's first operations during the war were defensive, being ordered along with most of the rest of the flotilla to patrol in the east end of the English Channel to protect the British Expeditionary Force during its passage to France in early August. D3, together with D2, E5 and E7 were deployed to the Heligoland Bight in support of a sweep of the Grand Fleet into the North Sea from 15 to 17 August. D3 was deployed off the mouth of the Ems estuary, and while she spotted a trawler and a German torpedo boat during the patrol, was unable to get into a position to deliver an attack. The 8th Flotilla continued to maintain patrols in the Bight, and on 12 September, D3, together with D5, E1, E8 and E9 left Great Yarmouth (Note: Yarmouth was often used as a forward operating base for the 8th Flotilla's patrols into the German Bight. Not only was it closer, but it allowed minefields near Southwold to be avoided.) for a patrol between Ameland and Sylt. Weather in the Bight was very poor, and D3's forward hydroplanes were damaged by the high seas. On 3 November 1914, German battlecruisers and cruisers attacked Yarmouth. D3, D5 and E10 were in Yarmouth harbour and were ordered out when gunfire was heard. D5, however, struck a mine and was sunk, and D3 and E10 were recalled.

On 28 June 1915, D3 was one of six submarines (Note: D1, D3, D6, E4, E6 and E16) ordered to patrol in the Bight in case of a suspected sortie of the German High Seas Fleet. D3 fired two torpedoes at a German patrol boat on 1 July, but both missed. On 24 July 1915, D3 left Harwich in company with E4 for a patrol off Horns Rev. They spotted a German submarine west of the North Hinder lightvessel. D3 continued on to her patrol area while E4 attempted to attack the German submarine. D3 observed several neutral ships, along with a number of trawlers during her patrol, but did not make any attacks. On 20 August 1915, D3 left for a patrol off the Dutch coast, but aborted the patrol on the evening of 21 August and returned to port because of an injured crewmember.

On 9 February 1916, D3 left port for a patrol in the Bight. She arrived on station on the night of 10/11 February, and on surfacing the next day, spotted four light cruisers and four torpedo boats that had just passed over her, heading east, but they were already too far away to engage. Later in the patrol she spotted several torpedo boats, but they were again too far away to attack. She returned to port on 15 February. In May 1916, it was decided to supplement the 8th Flotilla's normal operations in the German Bight with patrols off Terschelling on the Dutch coast. D3 left for Harwich on 1 June for a patrol to Terschelling, but was forced to return to base on 3 June with faulty motors. On 21 July, D3 left for another patrol off the Dutch coast, but was forced to return the next day when Arsine fumes from her batteries rendered her crew ill. D3 was still listed as part of the 8th Submarine Flotilla in August 1916, but by September, had transferred to the 3rd Submarine Flotilla, under the Rear Admiral Commanding East Coast of England, and no longer part of the Harwich Force.

From 19–27 February 1917, D3, together with the submarines D7, E32 and E54, and supported by the depot ship Vulcan, patrolled off the West coast of Ireland in order to counter German submarine attacks, and from 5 March, D3 was one of six submarines that set out with the cruiser Adventure) from Queenstown (now Cobh) in the South of Ireland for more anti submarine patrols. In late March, D3, together with D7 and D8, supported by the depot ship Platypus were deployed to Lough Swilly for patrols to the north and west of Ireland. On 23 April 1917, D3 spotted the German submarine UC-66 stopping and sinking the British barque Arethusa off Eagle Island, County Mayo. D3 closed and fired two torpedoes at UC-66, but both missed. Platypus's flotilla was ordered to Killybegs, on the Atlantic coast of County Donegal at the end of April 1917. On 8 May D3 fired two torpedoes at the British submarine E48, which missed. As a result, orders were changed so that adjacent submarines on patrol would be 30 nmi (35 mi) apart.

D3 was still listed as part of Platypus's Flotilla in December 1917, but by January had transferred to the 6th Submarine Flotilla, based at Portsmouth.

== Sinking ==
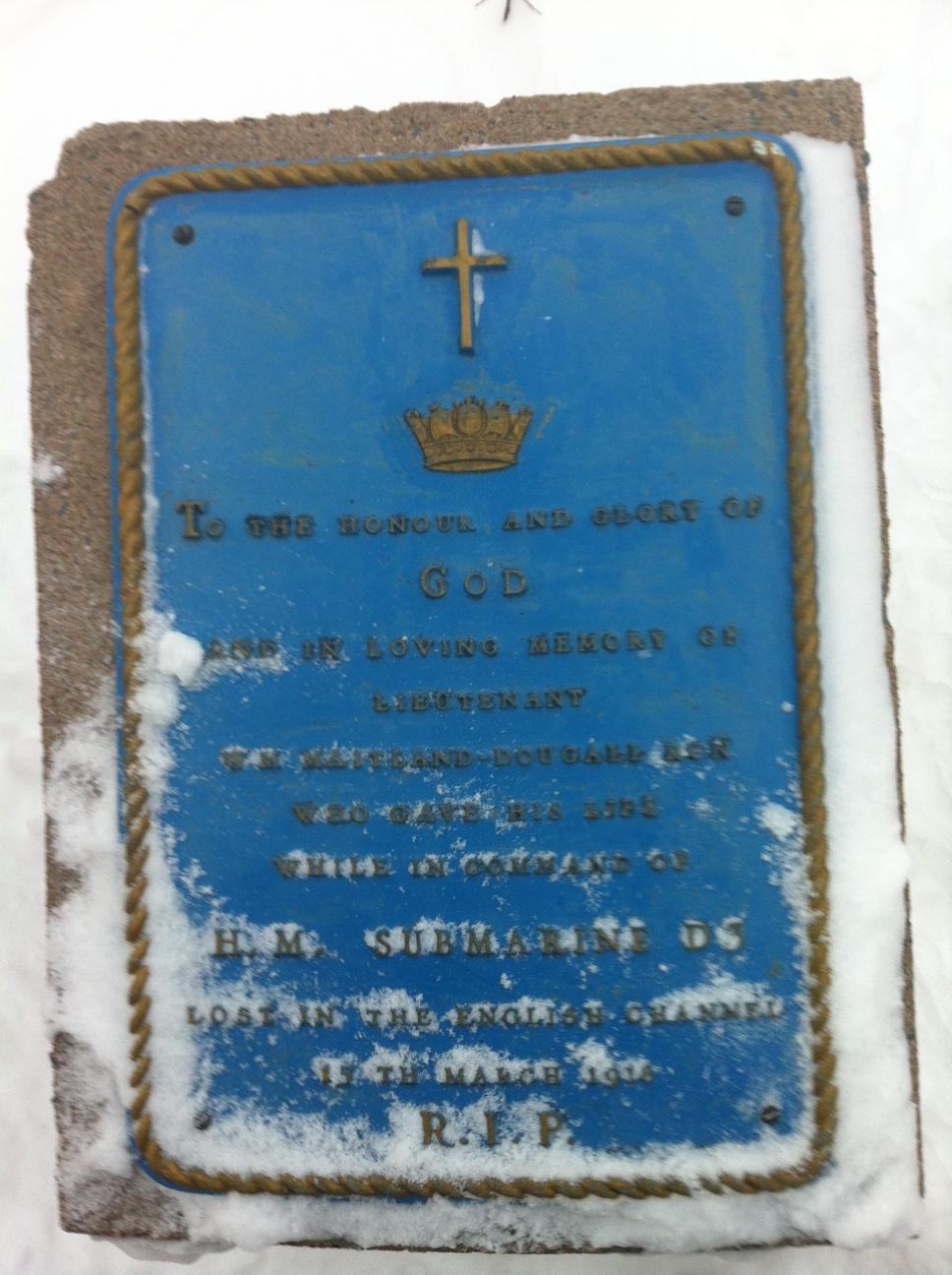
William McKinstry Heriot-Maitland-Dougall, the commanding officer of D3, Plaque, CFB Halifax

On 12 March 1918, D3 was on an anti-submarine patrol in English Channel off Dieppe when she was spotted by the French airship AT-0. D3 fired rockets in an attempt to identify herself, but AT-O's crew thought that the rockets were aimed at the airship, as they had not been informed of the signals used by D3. AT-0 returned fire with a machine gun and when D3 dived, dropped six 52-kilogram (115 lb) depth bombs. D3 came to the surface briefly before sinking. After sighting survivors in the water, and hearing their shouts, AT-0's commanding officer realised that a British submarine may have been sunk. AT-0 dropped lifebelt and left to find a ship to rescue the survivors, but the men drowned before help could arrive. All 25 of D3's crew were killed.
