= HMS E10 =

Submarine of the Royal Navy

History

United Kingdom
- Name: E10
- Builder: Vickers, Barrow
- Cost: £105,700
- Laid down: 10 July 1912
- Launched: 29 November 1913
- Commissioned: 10 March 1914
- Fate: Lost, 18 January 1915

General characteristics
- Class & type: E-class submarine
- Displacement: 662 long tons (673 t) surfaced; 807 long tons (820 t) submerged
- Length: 181 ft (55 m)
- Beam: 15 ft (4.6 m)
- Propulsion: 2 × 800 hp (597 kW) diesels; 2 × 420 hp (313 kW) electric; 2 screws
- Speed: 15.25 knots (28.24 km/h; 17.55 mph) surfaced; 10.25 knots (18.98 km/h; 11.80 mph) submerged
- Range: 3,000 nmi (5,600 km) at 10 kn (19 km/h; 12 mph); 65 nmi (120 km) at 5 kn (9.3 km/h; 5.8 mph)
- Complement: 30
- Armament: 5 × 18 inch (450 mm) torpedo tubes (2 bow, 2 beam, 1 stern)

HMS E10 was a British E class submarine built by Vickers, Barrow-in-Furness. She was laid down on 10 July 1912 and was commissioned on 10 March 1914. She costed £105,700. E10 was lost in the North Sea on or around 18 January 1915. E10 had sailed in company of HMS E5 from Yarmouth on 18 January 1915 for a patrol off Heligoland. She never returned from that patrol and was listed as officially lost with all hands on 21 January 1915.

== Design and construction ==
Like all post-E8 British E-class submarines, E10 had a displacement of 662 long tons (673 t) at the surface and 807 long tons (820 t) while submerged. She had a total length of 180 feet (55 m) and a beam of 22 feet 8.5 inches (6.922 m). She was powered by two 800 horsepower (600 kW) Vickers eight-cylinder two-stroke diesel engines and two 420 horsepower (310 kW) electric motors. The submarine had a maximum surface speed of 16 knots (30 km/h; 18 mph) and a submerged speed of 10 knots (19 km/h; 12 mph). British E-class submarines had fuel capacities of 50 long tons (51 t) of diesel and ranges of 3,255 miles (5,238 km; 2,829 nmi) when travelling at 10 knots (19 km/h; 12 mph). E10 was capable of operating submerged for five hours when travelling at 5 knots (9.3 km/h; 5.8 mph).

As with most of the early E class boats, E10 was not fitted with a deck gun during construction, and it is not known whether one was fitted later, as was the case with boats up to E19. She had five 18 inch (450 mm) torpedo tubes, two in the bow, one either side amidships, and one in the stern; a total of 10 torpedoes were carried.

E-Class submarines had wireless systems with 1 kilowatt (1.3 hp) power ratings; in some submarines, these were later upgraded to 3 kilowatts (4.0 hp) systems by removing a midship torpedo tube. Their maximum design depth was 100 feet (30 m) although in service some reached depths of below 200 feet (61 m). Some submarines contained Fessenden oscillator systems.

E10 laid down by Vickers at their Barrow shipyard on 10 July 1912, was launched on 29 November 1913 and completed on 10 August 1914.

== Crew ==
Her complement was three officers and 28 men.

== Service ==
On 5 September 1914, E10, together with D1 and D7 left Harwich to patrol in the Helgoland Bight with the hope of intercepting German patrol vessels. On 3 November 1914, German battlecruisers and cruisers attacked Yarmouth. E10 and the submarines D3 and D5 were in Yarmouth harbour and were ordered out when gunfire was heard. D5, however, struck a mine and was sunk, and D3 and E10 were recalled.

== Bibliography ==
- Akerman, P. (1989). Encyclopaedia of British submarines 1901–1955. p. 150. Maritime Books. ISBN 1-904381-05-7
- Harrison, A. N. (January 1979). The Development of HM Submarines From Holland No. 1 (1901) to Porpoise (1930) (BR3043). Ministry of Defence – via RN Subs.
- Hutchinson, Robert (2001). Jane's submarines : war beneath the waves from 1776 to the present day. London: HarperCollins. ISBN 9780007105588.
- Massie, Robert K. (2007). Castles of Steel: Britain, Germany and the Winning of the War at Sea. London: Vintage Books. ISBN 978-0-099-52378-9.
- Monograph No. 24: Home Waters—Part II: September and October 1914 (PDF). Naval Staff Monographs (Historical). Vol. XI. The Naval Staff, Training and Staff Duties Division. 1924. Archived from the original (PDF) on 6 August 2019.
- Monograph No. 28: Home Waters Part III: From November 1914 to the end of January 1915 (PDF). Naval Staff Monographs (Historical). Vol. XII. Naval Staff, Training and Staff Duties Division. 1925. Archived from the original (PDF) on 6 August 2019.
