= Greek ship Chios =

Six ships of the Hellenic Navy have borne the name Chios (Χίος), named after the island of Chios:

- Greek torpedo boat Chios (1873) (1873–1880), a torpedo boat
- Greek torpedo boat Chios (1881) (1881–1912), a Yarrow-built torpedo boat
- Greek destroyer Chios (1914), a Medea-class destroyer ordered in Britain, entered service with the British Royal Navy as HMS Melampus
- Chios (1922–1923), a former German freighter, later converted into a repair ship as Ifaistos
- Greek landing ship Chios (L195) (1943–1977), an LST1-class landing ship
- Greek landing ship Chios (L173) (1996–present), a Jason-class tank landing ship
