= HMS Medusa (1915) =

Destroyer of the Royal Navy

History

United Kingdom
- Name: HMS Medusa
- Builder: John Brown & Co., Clydebank
- Launched: 27 March 1915
- Completed: July 1915
- Fate: Badly damaged and abandoned after collision 25 March 1916; Ran aground and wrecked 5 April 1916

General characteristics
- Class & type: Medea-class destroyer
- Displacement: 1,178 long tons (1,197 t) deep load
- Length: 273 ft 4 in (83.31 m) oa
- Beam: 26 ft 8 in (8.13 m)
- Draught: 11 ft 2 in (3.40 m)
- Installed power: 25,000 shp (19,000 kW)
- Propulsion: 3× Yarrow boilers; Brown-Curtis steam turbines; 3 shafts
- Speed: 32 kn (37 mph; 59 km/h)
- Complement: 79
- Armament: 3 × 4-inch (102 mm) guns; 4 × 21 inch (533 mm) torpedo tubes

HMS Medusa was a Medea-class destroyer of the British Royal Navy. She was one of four destroyers, of similar design to the British M-class ordered by Greece in June 1914, which the British purchased during construction owing to the outbreak of the First World War.

Medusa (originally named Lesvos) was launched by the Scottish shipbuilder John Brown in March 1915 and was completed in July that year. She entered service with the Harwich Force, but was abandoned after being badly damaged in a collision on 26 March 1916.

== Design ==
In 1914, rivalries between Greece and Turkey led to Greece placing large orders for new warships, including a Bretagne-class battleship from France and two light cruisers and four destroyers from Britain. The British ships were ordered from the Coventry Syndicate, a consortium of the shipbuilders John Brown, Fairfield and Cammell Laird and the armament manufacturer Coventry Ordnance Works. The cruisers were to be built by Cammell Laird while two destroyers each would be built by John Brown and Fairfield.

The destroyers were of similar design to the contemporary M-class being built for the British Royal Navy, with the major difference being a modified machinery arrangement.

The ships were 273 feet 4 inches (83.31 m) long overall and 265 feet 0 inches (80.77 m) between perpendiculars, with a beam of 26 feet 8 inches (8.13 m) and a draught of 11 feet 2 inches (3.40 m). Displacement was 1,040 long tons (1,060 t) normal and 1,178 long tons (1,197 t) deep load. (Note: Displacements are for Medusa's sister ship Melampus. Conway's states normal displacement ranges of 1,007–1,040 long tons (1,023–1,057 t) and a deep load displacement of about 1,200 long tons (1,220 t).) Three Yarrow water-tube boilers fed steam to Brown-Curtis impulse steam turbines, driving two propeller shafts. The machinery was rated at 25,000 shaft horsepower (19,000 kW) giving a speed of 32 knots (37 mph; 59 km/h). The ship's boilers were arranged with two boilers in one large compartment adjacent to the engine room and one in a smaller compartment forward, while the British M-class had the larger boiler compartment forward and the small boiler compartment adjacent to the engine room. Three funnels were fitted.

Armament consisted of three 4-inch (102 mm) Mark VII guns and two twin 21-inch (533 mm) torpedo tubes. The ship had a crew of 79.

== Service ==
The four destroyers were ordered in June 1914, but the outbreak of the First World War resulted in them being purchased by Britain in August 1914. The second of the two ships built by John Brown, named Lesvos by the Greeks, was launched at John Brown's Clydebank shipyard on 27 March 1915 and was completed in May that year. She was the seventh Medusa to serve with the Royal Navy.

On commissioning, Medusa joined the Harwich Force. On 4–5 August 1915, Medusa took part in a sweep of four light cruisers and four destroyers of the Harwich Force against German torpedo-boats and trawlers that were believed to be patrolling off Terschelling. The force encountered no German surface forces, although a submarine, which quickly dived away, was sighted near the North Hinder light vessel. On 16 August 1915, 8 destroyers of the 10th Destroyer Flotilla, including Medusa, set out from Sheerness to escort the minelayer Princess Margaret which was tasked with laying a minefield on the Arum Bank. On the afternoon of 17 August, the force encountered a number of neutral and German fishing trawlers, which were suspected of signalling to Germany by radio. One trawler, the Roland BX.40, was boarded and scuttled by the destroyer Miranda, while Medusa stopped and searched a second German trawler, the Boreas, while the remaining ships of the force continued on with the mission. As the search found no radio, and believing that orders stated that trawlers could only be captured if radios were found, Medusa released Boreas. In fact, the commander of the operation, aboard Princess Margaret, had ordered that all German trawlers be sunk as well as any neutral trawlers found with radios. Meanwhile, the operation was abandoned after the main force encountered a group of German destroyers, one of which B98, torpedoed and damaged the destroyer Mentor.

On 24 March 1916, the Harwich Force set out on a raid by seaplanes launched by the seaplane carrier Vindex against a German airship base believed to be at Hoyer on the coast of Schleswig, with Medusa sailing as part of the escort. The air attack was launched early in the morning of 25 March. Two aircraft returned, reporting that the airship base was not at Hoyer as thought, but at Tondern further inland, and that they had been unable to attack it. Two divisions of destroyers, including Medusa, were ordered to search for the missing seaplanes. During the search, they encountered two German patrol boats, Braunschweig and Otto Rudolf, which were quickly sunk by gunfire. During this engagement, the destroyer Laverock collided with Medusa. Medusa's engine room was holed and began to flood, meaning that Medusa lost all power and was unable to steam. Medusa was taken under tow by the flotilla leader Lightfoot. At first Lightfoot proceeded at a speed of 15 knots (17 mph; 28 km/h) with the two ships and escorting destroyers coming under frequent attack by German aircraft. As the day went on, the weather grew steadily worse, with frequent snow storms and heavy seas, and at 7:40 pm the tow-line parted with the ships still only 50 nautical miles (58 mi; 93 km) from Horns Reef. Commodore Tyrwhitt, commander of the Harwich Force, ordered Medusa's crew to abandon ship. The destroyer Lassoo took off Medusa's crew, sustaining minor damage to her stem during the rescue operation, leaving Medusa apparently in sinking condition in heavy weather. Despite this, Medusa remained afloat, and was sighted by a Dutch trawler on 27 March. On hearing reports that Medusa was still afloat, the Royal Navy sent three submarines, D6, E4 and E29 to search for her. On 3 April, Medusa was discovered by another Dutch trawler which took the destroyer under tow and towed her to Terschelling, but the destroyer ran aground on a sandbank at the entrance to Terschelling harbour on 5 April and was wrecked, with salvage attempts being abandoned on 22 April.

== Pennant numbers ==
Pennant number	Dates
H90	1915–

== Bibliography ==
- Colledge, J. J.; Warlow, Ben (2006) [1969]. Ships of the Royal Navy: The Complete Record of All Fighting Ships of the Royal Navy from the 15th Century to the Present (3rd Rev ed.). London: Chatham Publishing. ISBN 978-1-86176-281-8. OCLC 67375475.
- Corbett, Julian S. (1923). Naval Operations: Volume III. History of the Great War. London: Longmans, Green and Co.
- Dittmar, F. J.; Colledge, J. J. (1972). British Warships 1914–1919. Shepperton, UK: Ian Allan. ISBN 0-7110-0380-7.
- Dorling, Taprell (1932). Endless Story: Being an Account of the Work of the Destroyers, Flotilla Leaders, Torpedo-Boats and Patrol Boats in the Great War. London: Hodder and Stoughton.
- Friedman, Norman (2009). British Destroyers: From Earliest Days to the Second World War. Barnsley, UK: Seaforth Publishing. ISBN 978-1-84832-049-9.
- Gardiner, Robert; Gray, Randal, eds. (1985). Conway's All The World's Fighting Ships 1906–1921. London: Conway Maritime Press. ISBN 0-85177-245-5.
- Kemp, Paul (1999). The Admiralty Regrets: British Warship Losses of the 20th Century. Stroud, UK: Sutton Publishing. ISBN 0-7509-1567-6.
- Lyon, David (1977). "The First Town Class 1908–31: Part 1". Warship. Vol. 1, no. 1. pp. 48–58. ISBN 0-85177-132-7.
- March, Edgar J. (1966). British Destroyers: A History of Development, 1892–1953; Drawn by Admiralty Permission From Official Records & Returns, Ships' Covers & Building Plans. London: Seeley Service. OCLC 164893555.
- Monograph No. 30: Home Waters Part V: From July to October 1915 (PDF). Naval Staff Monographs (Historical). Vol. XIV. Naval Staff, Training and Staff Duties Division. 1926.
- Monograph No. 31: Home Waters Part VI: From October 1915 to May 1916 (PDF). Naval Staff Monographs (Historical). Vol. XV. Naval Staff, Training and Staff Duties Division. 1926.
