= Battle of Heligoland Bight (1914) =

First major naval battle of First World War

- Part of the First World War
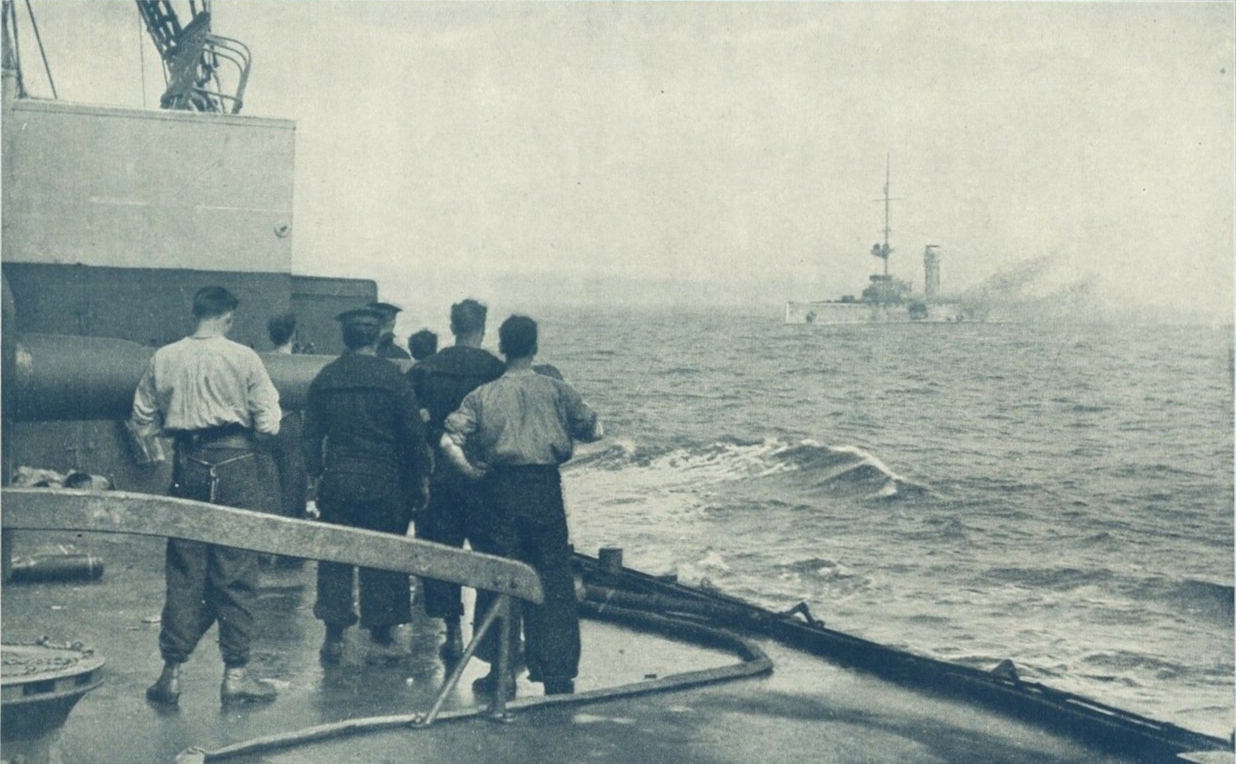
- German light cruiser SMS Mainz, in background, shortly before heeling over and sinking, 28 August 1914
Date	28 August 1914
Location	Heligoland Bight, North Sea 54.19°N 7.51°E
Result	British victory

Belligerents
United Kingdom	Germany

Commanders and leaders
David Beatty; Reginald Tyrwhitt; Roger Keyes	Franz Hipper; Leberecht Maass †

Strength
5 battlecruisers 8 light cruisers 33 destroyers 8 submarines	6 light cruisers 19 torpedo boats 12 minesweepers

Casualties and losses
35 killed 55 wounded 1 light cruiser damaged 3 destroyers damaged	712 killed 149 wounded 336 captured 3 light cruisers sunk 1 torpedo boat sunk 3 light cruisers damaged 3 torpedo boats damaged
- The battle location in the North Sea

The Battle of Heligoland Bight was the first Anglo-German naval battle of the First World War, fought on 28 August 1914, between ships of the United Kingdom and Germany. The battle took place in the south-eastern North Sea, when the British attacked German patrols off the north-west German coast. The German High Seas Fleet was in harbour on the north German coast while the British Grand Fleet was out in the northern North Sea. Both sides engaged in long-distance sorties with cruisers and battlecruisers, with close reconnaissance of the area of sea near the German coast—the Heligoland Bight—by destroyer.

The British devised a plan to ambush German destroyers on their daily patrols. A British flotilla of 31 destroyers and two cruisers under Commodore Reginald Tyrwhitt, with submarines commanded by Commodore Roger Keyes, was dispatched. They were supported at longer range by an additional six light cruisers commanded by William Goodenough and five battlecruisers commanded by Vice Admiral David Beatty.

Surprised, outnumbered and outgunned, the German fleet suffered 712 sailors killed, 530 injured and 336 taken prisoner; three German light cruisers (SMS Ariadne, Cöln and Mainz) and one torpedo boat (SMS V187) were sunk; three more light cruisers (SMS Strassburg, Stettin and Frauenlob) and three torpedo boats suffered damage. The British suffered casualties of 35 killed and 55 wounded; one light cruiser and three destroyers suffered damage. Despite the disparity of the ships involved in the battle, the battle was regarded as a great victory in Britain, where the returning ships were met by cheering crowds.

Beatty was vaunted a hero, although he had taken little part in the action or planning of the raid, which was led by Commodore Tyrwhitt and conceived by him and Keyes, who had persuaded the Admiralty to adopt it. The raid might have led to disaster, had the additional forces under Beatty not been sent by Admiral John Jellicoe at the last minute. The German government, the Kaiser in particular, restricted the freedom of action of the German fleet, instructing it to avoid contact with superior forces for several months thereafter.

== Prelude ==
The battle took place less than a month after the British declaration of war against Germany on 5 August 1914. The war on land led to defeat for the French and their Allies at the Battle of the Frontiers, the German invasion of Belgium and France. British naval tactics had typically involved a close blockade of ports and this had been the British plan for war against Germany up to 1913. The Admiralty had realised that the advent of submarines armed with torpedoes and mines meant that operations involving capital ships near an opponent's ports would place them at great risk of surprise attack. Ships would be obliged to keep moving and return to port every few days to refuel.

The German navy had expected that Britain would adopt its traditional approach and had invested in submarines and coast defences. The main body of the German navy—the High Seas Fleet (HSF)—was outnumbered by the British Grand Fleet stationed around home waters and could not expect victory in a general fleet engagement. The HSF adopted a strategy of waiting in defended home ports for opportunities to attack parts of the larger British force. The British adopted a strategy of distant blockade, patrolling the North Sea rather than waters close to Germany. The Germans had two alternatives to break out into the Atlantic Ocean, either by passing through the 20 mi (17 nmi; 32 km)-wide Straits of Dover, defended by British submarines, mine barrages and a large number of older and smaller warships or exit the northern end of the North Sea, running the gauntlet of the Grand Fleet based at Scapa Flow in Orkney and the 200 mi (170 nmi; 320 km)-wide narrow point between Britain and Norway. Without access to the Atlantic, the German ships were contained in an area where they could not attack Allied merchant shipping. To keep the HSF in harbour, the Grand Fleet made occasional forays and patrolled with smaller cruiser and battlecruiser squadrons.

The bulk of the British Expeditionary Force (BEF) was transported to France between 12 and 21 August, protected by British destroyers and submarines patrolling Heligoland Bight, which German ships would have to cross if they sortied from their bases. The Grand Fleet remained on patrol in the centre of the North Sea ready to move south but no attack came. The German army had anticipated a rapid transfer of the British army to France, German naval planners overestimated the time the British would need and German submarines were on patrol seeking the Home Fleet.

== British plan ==
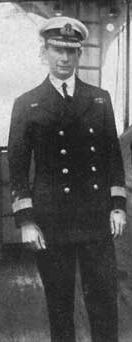
Commodore Roger Keyes, who devised the plan

At Harwich, Commodore Roger Keyes commanded a squadron of long-range submarines that regularly patrolled the Heligoland Bight and Commodore Reginald Tyrwhitt commanded a destroyer patrol. They observed that German destroyers had adopted a regular pattern of patrols where each evening cruisers would escort destroyers out of harbour to patrol for British ships during the night before being met and escorted home each morning. Keyes and Tyrwhitt proposed to send a superior force during darkness to ambush the German destroyers as they returned. Three British submarines would surface in a position to draw the destroyers back out to sea while a larger British force of 31 destroyers accompanied by nine submarines would cut them off from Germany. Other submarines would wait for any larger German ships leaving the Jade estuary to help.

Keyes impressed Winston Churchill, the First Lord of the Admiralty with the daring of his plan, which was adopted with some changes. An attack at 08:00 on the German daytime patrol was preferred. Keyes and Tyrwhitt requested support for their operation, in particular bringing the Grand Fleet south and the support of the squadron of six light cruisers commanded by Commodore William Goodenough. This was refused by the Chief of Staff, Vice Admiral Doveton Sturdee, who instead agreed to place only lighter forces consisting of Cruiser Force K (Rear Admiral Gordon Moore) with the battlecruisers HMS New Zealand and Invincible 40 mi (35 nmi; 64 km) to the north-west and Cruiser Force C comprising the Cressy-class armoured cruisers, HMS Cressy, Aboukir, Bacchante, Hogue and Euryalus, 100 mi (87 nmi; 160 km) west.

The attack was planned for 28 August; the submarines were to sail on 26 August, while Keyes would travel on the destroyer Lurcher and the surface ships would depart at dawn on 27 August. Tyrwhitt, aboard the brand new light cruiser HMS Arethusa, would command the 3rd Flotilla of 16 modern Laforey-class destroyers, whilst his subordinate, Captain William Blunt, aboard the light cruiser HMS Fearless, would command the 1st Destroyer Flotilla of 16 older destroyers. Tyrwhitt had requested the replacement of his cruiser HMS Amethyst because she was too slow to keep up with his destroyers but Arethusa did not arrive until 26 August. Her crew was inexperienced and it was discovered that its new 4 in (102 mm) Mk V guns jammed when fired.

Admiral Sir John Jellicoe, commanding the Grand Fleet, was not told of the plan until 26 August. Jellicoe immediately requested permission to send reinforcements to join the raid and to move the fleet closer to the action but was allowed only to send battlecruisers in support. Jellicoe dispatched Vice Admiral David Beatty with the battlecruisers HMS Lion, Queen Mary and Princess Royal; Goodenough, with the 1st Light Cruiser Squadron, comprising the light cruisers HMS Southampton, Birmingham, Falmouth, Liverpool, Lowestoft and Nottingham. Jellicoe sailed south from Scapa Flow with the remainder of the fleet. Jellicoe sent a message advising Tyrwhitt that he should expect reinforcements but the signal was delayed at Harwich and never received. Tyrwhitt did not discover the additional forces until Goodenough's ships appeared through the mist, leading to a certain apprehension because he was expecting to meet only German vessels. The E-class submarines HMS E4, E5 and E9 were ordered to attack reinforcing or retreating German vessels. HMS E6, E7 and E8 were positioned 4 mi (3.5 nmi; 6.4 km) further out to draw the German destroyers out to sea. HMS D2 and D8 were stationed off the river Ems to attack reinforcements should they come from that direction.

== Battle ==
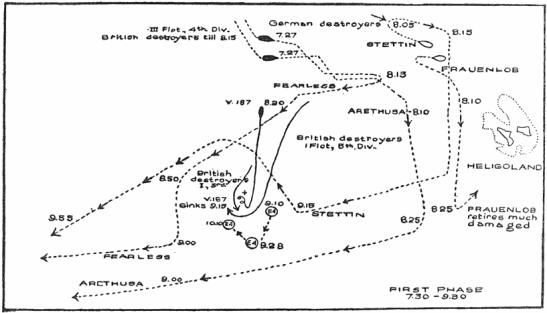
First phase 07:30–09:30

At around 07:00, Arethusa, steaming south towards the anticipated position of the German ships, sighted a German torpedo boat, G194. Accompanying Arethusa were the 16 destroyers of the 3rd Destroyer Flotilla. 2 mi (1.7 nmi; 3.2 km) behind were Fearless with the 1st Destroyer Flotilla of 16 destroyers and 8 mi (7.0 nmi; 13 km) behind them was Goodenough with the six cruisers; visibility was no more than 3 mi (2.6 nmi; 4.8 km). G194 immediately turned towards Heligoland, sending wireless reports Rear Admiral Leberecht Maass, commander of the German destroyer squadron. Maass informed Rear Admiral Franz von Hipper, responsible for local defence and commander of the German battlecruiser squadron. Hipper was unaware of the scale of the attack but ordered the light cruisers SMS Stettin and Frauenlob to defend the destroyers. The light cruisers SMS Mainz moored on the Ems, SMS Strassburg, Cöln, Ariadne, Stralsund and Kolberg from the river Jade, Danzig and München from Brunsbüttelkoog on the river Elbe were ordered to raise steam.

Tyrwhitt ordered four destroyers to attack G194 and the sound of gunfire alerted the remaining German destroyers moving north, that turned south towards home. Before they could complete the turn, they were sighted by British destroyers which commenced firing. The trailing destroyer V1 was hit, followed by the destroyer-minesweepers D8 and T33. G9 called for fire against the attacking ships from coastal artillery but the mist meant the gunners could not tell which ships were which. At 07:26, Tyrwhitt turned east, to follow the sound of gunfire sighting ten German destroyers, which he chased through the increasing mist for 30 minutes, until the ships reached Heligoland and he was forced to turn away. At 07:58, Stettin and Frauenlob arrived, reversing the situation so that the British destroyers were obliged to retreat towards Arethusa and Fearless. Stettin withdrew, since the German destroyers had escaped but Frauenlob was engaged by Arethusa. Arethusa was better armed but two of its four 4 in (102 mm) guns jammed and another was damaged by fire. Frauenlob — armed with ten 10.5 cm (4.1 in) guns — caused considerable damage before a shell from one of Arethusa's two 6 in (152 mm) guns destroyed her bridge, killing 37 men including the captain, forcing her to withdraw and return to Wilhelmshaven badly damaged.

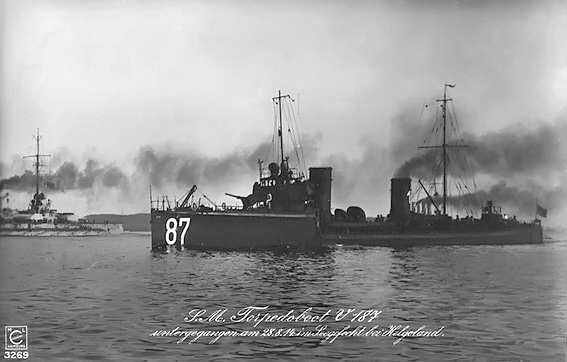
German torpedo boat SMS V187

At 08:12, Tyrwhitt returned to the original plan to sweep the area from east to west. Six returning German destroyers were sighted which turned to flee, when V187 turned back. The German ship had seen two cruisers, Nottingham and Lowestoft from Goodenough's squadron ahead and tried to pass through the British destroyers by surprise, only to be surrounded by eight destroyers and sunk. As British ships began to rescue survivors from the water, the German light cruiser Stettin approached and opened fire, forcing the British to abandon the rescue, leaving behind British sailors. The British submarine E4 had observed the action and launched a torpedo at Stettin but missed; Stettin attempted to ram the submarine, which dived to escape. When E4 resurfaced the larger ships had gone and the submarine rescued the British crewmen afloat in small boats with the German survivors. The Germans were left behind with a compass and direction toward the mainland as the submarine was too small to take them.

=== Confusion of ships ===
At 08:15, Keyes—with Lurcher and another destroyer—sighted two four-funnelled cruisers. Still unaware that additional British ships were involved, he signalled Invincible that he was chasing two German cruisers. Goodenough received the signal, abandoned his search for enemy vessels to attack and steamed to assist Keyes against his own ships, Lowestoft and Nottingham. Keyes, being chased by four more German cruisers, attempted to lure them towards Invincible and New Zealand, reporting them as enemy ships. Eventually, Keyes recognised Southampton and the ships attempted to rejoin Tyrwhitt. The British submarines were still unaware that the other ships were present and at 09:30, a British submarine fired two torpedoes at Southampton; the submarine missed and then escaped when Southampton tried to ram it. Lowestoft and Nottingham remained out of communication range; separated from the rest of their squadron, they took no further part in the action. Tyrwhitt turned to assist Keyes, on receipt of the signal that he was being chased, sighted Stettin but lost her in the mist before coming upon Fearless and her destroyer squadron. Arethusa was badly damaged and at 10:17 Fearless came alongside and both cruisers were stopped for twenty minutes while repairs were made to the boilers.

=== German cruisers ===
Cöln, Strassburg and Ariadne had sailed from Wilhelmshaven to join the German ships, while Mainz was approaching from a different direction. Admiral Maass was still unaware of the nature of the attack and dispersed his ships in search of the enemy. Strassburg was first to find Arethusa and attacked with shells and torpedoes but was driven off by torpedo attacks from the destroyers. As Tyrwhitt turned away to the west, Cöln—with Admiral Maass—approached from the south-east and was also chased away by torpedoes. Tyrwhitt signalled Beatty requesting reinforcements and Goodenough with the four cruisers remaining with him came to assist; the force turned west.

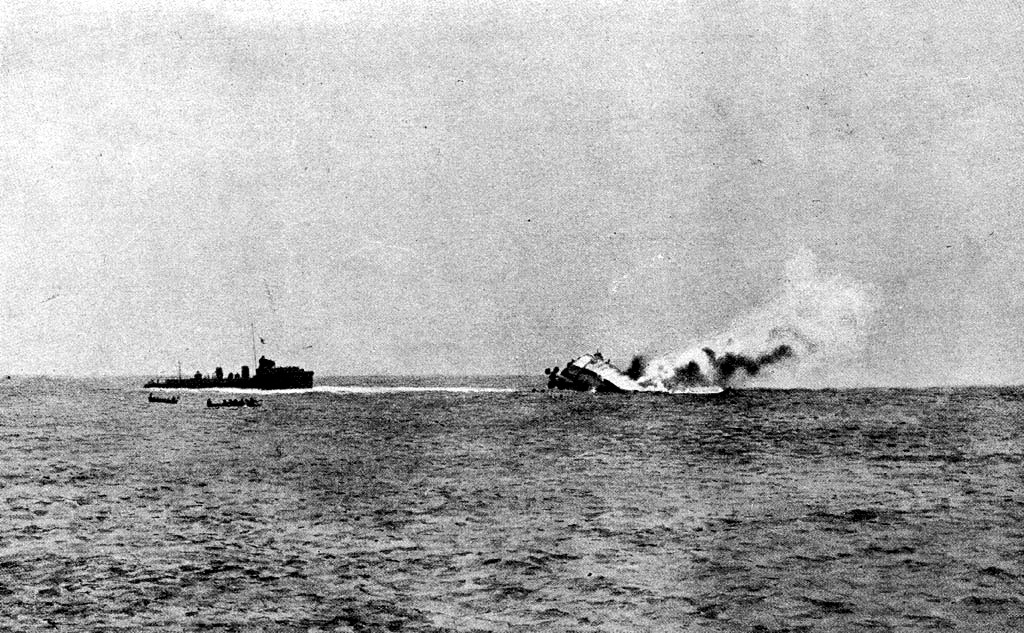
SMS Mainz sinking

Beatty had been following the events by radio 40 mi (35 nmi; 64 km) to the north-west. By 11:35, the British ships had still not completed their mission and withdrawn; with the rising tide, larger German ships would be able to leave harbour and join the engagement. Beatty took his five battlecruisers south-eastwards at maximum speed, an hour away from the engagement. While the advantages of using his more powerful ships to rescue the others was clear, this had to be weighed against the possibility of mischance by torpedo or of meeting German dreadnoughts once the tide was up.

At 11:30, Tyrwhitt's squadron came upon the German cruiser Mainz and the ships engaged for 20 minutes, before the arrival of Goodenough caused Mainz to attempt an escape. Goodenough gave chase and in trying to lose him, Mainz came back across the path of Arethusa and her destroyers. Her steering was damaged, causing her to turn back into the path of Goodenough's ships and she was hit by shells and a torpedo. At 12:20, her captain ordered his ship to be scuttled and the crew to abandon ship. Keyes had now joined the main body of ships and brought Lurcher alongside Mainz to take off the crew. Three British destroyers had been seriously damaged in the engagement. Strassburg and Cöln attacked together but the battle was interrupted by Beatty and the battlecruisers. A destroyer officer wrote,

There straight ahead of us in lovely procession, like elephants walking through a pack of ... dogs came Lion, Queen Mary, Princess Royal, Invincible and New Zealand ...How solid they looked, how utterly earthquaking. We pointed out our latest aggressor to them ... and we went west while they went east ... and just a little later we heard the thunder of their guns.

— Chalmers

=== Battlecruisers ===
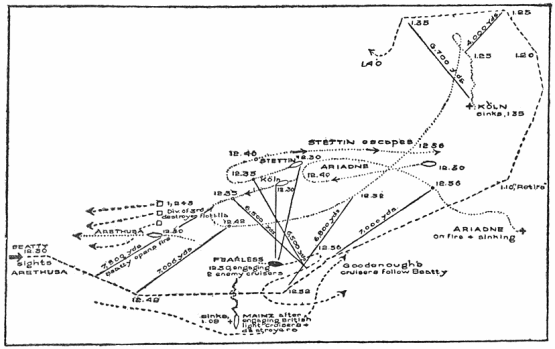
Final phase 12:30–01:40

Strassburg managed to disengage and escape when the battlecruisers approached but Cöln was cut off and quickly disabled by the much larger guns of the battlecruisers. She was saved from immediate sinking by the sighting of another German light cruiser, Ariadne, to which Beatty gave chase and again quickly overcame. Ariadne was left to sink, which she eventually did at 15:00, attended by the German ships Danzig and Stralsund who took off survivors. At 13:10, Beatty turned north-west and ordered all the British ships to withdraw, since the tide had now risen sufficiently for larger German ships to pass through the Jade estuary. Passing Cöln again, he opened fire, sinking her.

Attempts to rescue the crew were interrupted by the arrival of a submarine; one survivor was rescued by a German ship two days later, out of some 250 men who had survived the sinking. Rear Admiral Maass perished with his ship. Four German cruisers survived the engagement, saved by the mist. Strassburg nearly approached the battlecruisers but saw them in time and turned away. She had four funnels, like the British Town-class cruisers, which caused sufficient confusion to allow her time to disappear into the mist. The German battlecruisers Moltke and Von der Tann left the Jade at 14:10 and began a cautious search for other ships. Rear Admiral Hipper arrived in Seydlitz at 15:10 but by then the battle was over.

== Aftermath ==
=== Analysis ===
Final phase about 13:00–14:00 CET (German perspective)

To preserve his ships the Kaiser determined that the fleet should, "hold itself back and avoid actions which can lead to greater losses". Admiral Hugo von Pohl, Chief of the German Naval Staff, wired Ingenohl that, "in his anxiety to preserve the fleet [William] ... wished you to wire for his consent before entering a decisive action". Alfred von Tirpitz was outraged by this decision and wrote after the war,

The Emperor did not wish for losses of this sort ... Orders [were] issued by the Emperor ... after an audience with Pohl, to which I as usual was not summoned, to restrict the initiative of the Commander-in-Chief of the North Sea Fleet. The loss of ships was to be avoided; fleet sallies and any greater undertakings must be approved by His Majesty in advance. I took the first opportunity to explain to the Emperor the fundamental error of such a muzzling policy. This step had no success but on the contrary, there sprang up from that day forth an estrangement between the Emperor and myself which steadily increased.

After the war, Churchill wrote,

The results of this action were far-reaching. Henceforward, the weight of British Naval prestige lay heavy across all German sea enterprise ... The German Navy was indeed "muzzled". Except for furtive movements by individual submarines and minelayers, not a dog stirred from August till November.

— Churchill

The Germans knew nothing of our defective staff work or the risks we had run.

— Churchill

Lieutenant Stephen King-Hall on Southampton, later wrote about the battle that

As may be deduced from these extracts the staff work was almost criminally negligent and it was a near miracle that we did not sink one or more of our submarines or that one of them did not sink us. Furthermore if anyone had suggested, say in 1917, that our battle-cruisers should rush about without anti-submarine protection and hundreds of miles away from the battle fleet in a mine infested area a few miles from the German battle fleet, he would have been certified on the spot.

German sketch showing all actions of the battle (expandable)

The Germans had assumed that their cruisers, leaving port one by one, would not meet larger ships or a superior force and failed to keep their ships together so they might have better odds in any engagement. Beatty—when faced with the choice of leaving one of his ships to finish off disabled enemies—had elected to keep his squadron together and only later return in force to finish off the ships. Goodenough managed to lose track of two cruisers, which played no further part in the battle.

German light cruisers armed with larger numbers of faster firing 10.5 cm (4.1 in) guns, proved inferior to similar British cruisers with fewer but more powerful 6 in (15 cm) guns. The German ships proved difficult to sink despite severe damage and impressed the British with the quality of their firing. British and German sources reported the determination and bravery of the defeated German ships when overwhelmed. No one reported the presence of British cruisers to Admiral Hipper until 14:35. Had he known, he could have brought his battlecruisers to sea faster and consolidated his fleet, possibly preventing German losses and instead inflicting some on the departing British ships. The British operation took longer than anticipated and large German ships would have had sufficient high water to join the battle.

The British side suffered from poor communication, with ships failing to report engagement with the enemy to each other. The initial failure to include Jellicoe in planning the raid could have led to disaster, had he not sent reinforcements and the communication failures meant British ships were unaware of the new arrivals and could have attacked them. There was no way to warn off British submarines which might have targeted their own ships. It had been the decision of Admiral Sturdee—Admiralty Chief of Staff—not to inform Jellicoe and also not to send additional larger ships which had originally been requested by Keyes. Jellicoe had countermanded this decision once he knew of the raid, by sending ships which were part of his command. Keyes was disappointed that the opportunity for greater success had been lost by not including the additional cruisers properly into the plan as he had originally intended. Jellicoe was disturbed by the Admiralty's failure to discuss the raid with their commander in chief of the Home Fleet at sea.

The Germans appreciated that standing patrols by destroyers wasted time and resources, leaving them open to attack. The Germans sowed defensive minefields to prevent enemy ships from approaching and freed the destroyers to escort larger ships, which were never to be sent out one by one. The British realised it was foolish to have sent Arethusa into battle with inadequate training and jammed guns. British ships were criticised for having fired considerable ammunition and torpedoes with little effect but this criticism backfired when at the Battle of Dogger Bank in 1915, British crews tried to conserve ammunition and missed opportunities to damage German vessels.

=== Casualties ===
Germany lost the light cruisers Mainz, Cöln and Ariadne and the destroyer V187 sunk. The light cruisers Frauenlob, Strassburg and Stettin had been damaged and returned to base with casualties. German casualties were 1,242 with 712 men killed, including Maass and the destroyer commodore. The British took 336 prisoners, 224 German sailors were rescued by Commodore Keyes on the destroyer Lurcher and brought to England, the son of Tirpitz being among the prisoners. The British had lost no ships and casualties did not exceed 35 men killed and about 40 wounded.

== See also ==
- Second Battle of Heligoland Bight (1917)
- Battle of Heligoland
