= British D-class submarine =

Type of British submarines in service before WWI

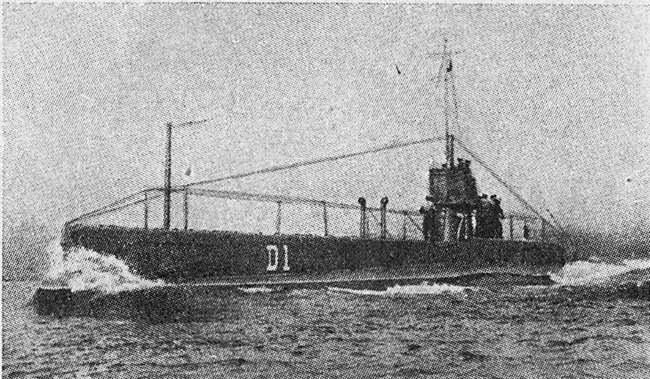
- HMS D1

Class overview
- Name: D-class
- Builders: Vickers, Barrow; HM Dockyard, Chatham
- Operators: Royal Navy
- Preceded by: C class
- Succeeded by: E class
- Completed: 8
- Lost: 4

General characteristics
- Type: Submarine
- Displacement: 483 tons surfaced / 595 tons submerged
- Length: 163.0 ft (49.7 m) (oa)
- Beam: 13.6 ft (4.1 m) (oa)
- Propulsion: 550 hp (410 kW) electric 1750 hp diesel twin screws
- Speed: 14.0 kn surfaced / 10.0 (design) 9.0 (service) submerged
- Range: 2500 nmi at 10 kn, surface / 45 nmi at 5 kn, submerged
- Complement: 25
- Armament: 3 × 18-inch (45-cm) torpedo tubes (2 forward, one aft, 6 torpedoes); 1 × 12-pounder (76 mm) QF gun

The D-class submarine was the Royal Navy's first class of submarines capable of operating significantly beyond coastal waters. They were also the first boats to be fitted with wireless transmitters. Ten were laid down between 1907 and 1910, though only 8 were completed as D-class boats. The final two hulls were completed as British E-class submarine.

== Design and description ==
The patrol submarines evolved from the C-class boats. They were designed to be propelled by diesel motors on the surface to avoid the problems with petrol engines experienced with the A class. These boats were designed for foreign service with an endurance of 2,500 nautical miles (4,600 km; 2,900 mi) at 10 knots (19 km/h; 12 mph) on the surface and much improved living conditions for a larger crew.

D-class boats were fitted with twin screws for greater manoeuvrability and were fitted with saddle tanks. The D class were the first submarines to be equipped with deck guns forward of the conning tower beginning with D6. Also, reserve buoyancy was increased to 20.6%. Armament also included three 18-inch (460 mm) torpedo tubes (2 vertically in the bow and 1 in the stern). The D class was also the first class of British submarines to have standard radio fitted. The aerial was attached to the mast of the conning tower that was lowered before diving.

With their enlarged bridge structure the boat profile was recognisably that of the modern submarine. The D-class submarines were considered to be so innovative that the prototype, D1, was built in utmost secrecy in a securely guarded building shed. She was launched at Barrow with equal secrecy, with only departmental heads and a few officers from the cruiser HMS Mercury, that was currently in dock being present. Once moved to the fitting out berth, she was once again screened from view.

The boats cost between £79,910 and £89,410 each excluding the deck gun.

== Operations ==
The D class were based at Harwich, Immingham, Blyth and Dover. Their wartime role was to sink German warships. In the latter stages of World War I the D class were used for training crews based at Portsmouth.

During World War I the boats patrolled the North Sea and the Heligoland Bight, and protected cross channel troopships. During the war, four boats (D2, D3, D5, and D6) were lost, and the remainder (D4, D7, and D8) were paid off in July 1919.

== Boats ==
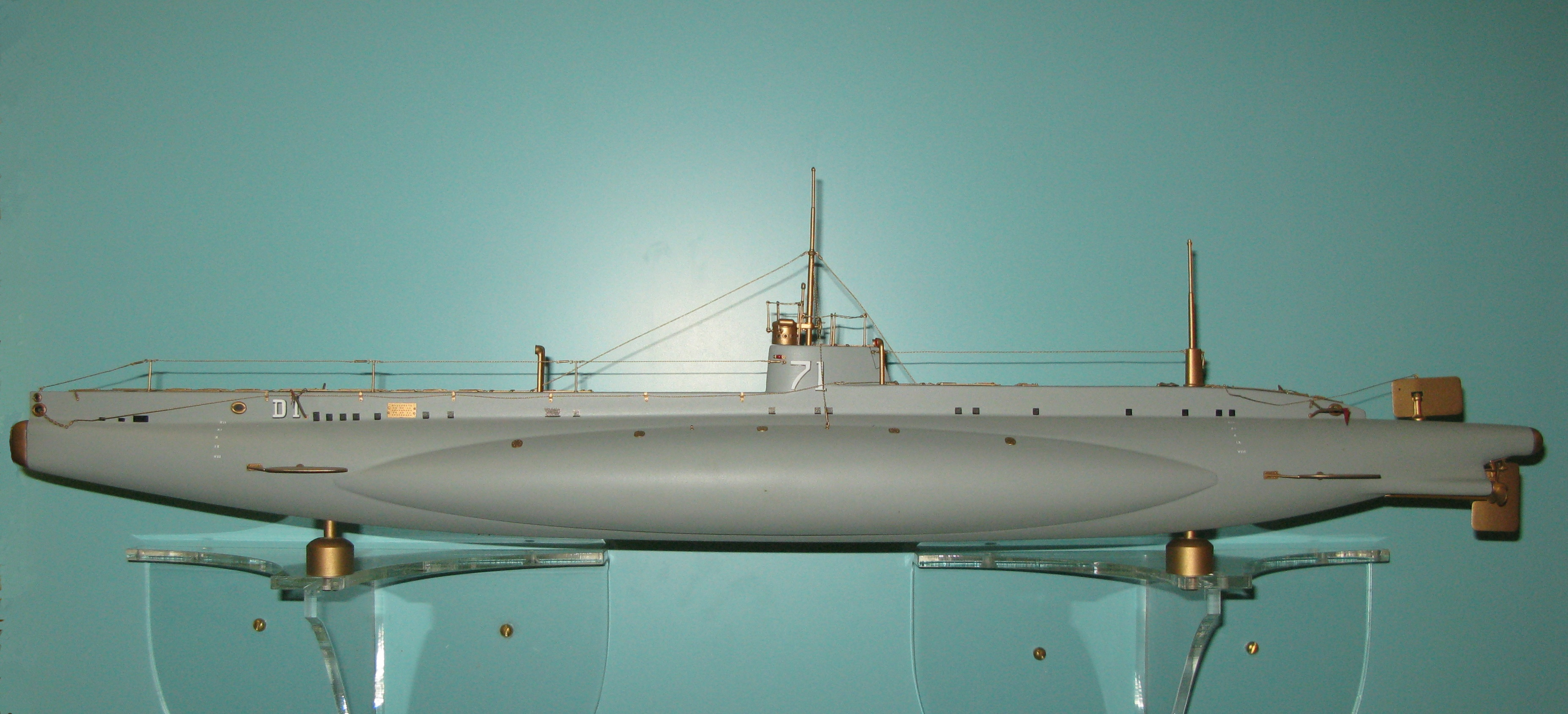
A model of HMS D1

Eight D-class boats were built:

- HMS D1
- HMS D2
- HMS D3
- HMS D4
- HMS D5
- HMS D6
- HMS D7
- HMS D8

There were plans for a further two, D9 and D10, but these were launched at Chatham Dockyard as HMS E1 and HMS E2.

== See also ==
- Not to be confused with the United States D-class submarine of 1909-1910.
