= Battle of Heligoland =

Battle of Heligoland, Battle of Helgoland, or Battle of Heligoland Bight may refer to

- Battle of Heligoland (1849), a First Schleswig War naval battle
- Battle of Heligoland (1864), a Second Schleswig War naval battle
- Battle of Heligoland Bight (1914), a World War I naval battle
- Second Battle of Heligoland Bight, a 1917 World War I naval battle
- Battle of the Heligoland Bight (1939), a World War II air battle
