= HMS E5 =

British E-class submarine

- HMS E5

History

United Kingdom
- Name: E5
- Builder: Vickers, Barrow
- Cost: £106,700
- Laid down: 9 June 1911
- Launched: 17 May 1912
- Commissioned: 28 June 1913
- Fate: Sunk presumedly by naval mine, 7 March 1916

General characteristics
- Class & type: E-class submarine
- Displacement: 652 long tons (662 t) (surfaced); 795 long tons (808 t) (submerged)
- Length: 178 ft (54 m)
- Beam: 15 ft 5 in (4.70 m)
- Installed power: 1,600 hp (1,200 kW) (diesel engines); 840 hp (630 kW) (electric motors)
- Propulsion: 2 × diesel engines; 2 × electric motors; 2 × screws
- Speed: 15 kn (17 mph; 28 km/h) (surfaced); 9.5 kn (10.9 mph; 17.6 km/h) (submerged)
- Range: 3,000 nmi (3,500 mi; 5,600 km) at 10 kn (12 mph; 19 km/h); 65 nmi (75 mi; 120 km) at 5 kn (5.8 mph; 9.3 km/h)
- Complement: Three officers and 28 men
- Armament: 4 × 18 inch (450 mm) torpedo tubes (1 bow, 2 beam, 1 stern)

HMS E5 was a British E-class submarine built by Vickers Barrow-in-Furness. She was laid down on 9 June 1911 and was commissioned on 28 June 1913. She cost £106,700. E5 was sunk, probably by striking a mine, on 7 March 1916.

== Design ==
The early British E-class submarines, from E1 to E8, had a displacement of 652 long tons (662 t) at the surface and 795 long tons (808 t) while submerged. They had a length overall of 180 feet (55 m) and a beam of 22 feet 8.5 inches (6.922 m), and were powered by two 800 horsepower (600 kW) Vickers eight-cylinder two-stroke diesel engines and two 420 horsepower (310 kW) electric motors. The class had a maximum surface speed of 16 knots (30 km/h; 18 mph) and a submerged speed of 10 knots (19 km/h; 12 mph), with a fuel capacity of 50 long tons (51 t) of diesel affording a range of 3,225 miles (5,190 km; 2,802 nmi) when travelling at 10 knots (19 km/h; 12 mph), while submerged they had a range of 85 miles (137 km; 74 nmi) at 5 knots (9.3 km/h; 5.8 mph).

The early 'Group 1' E class boats were armed with four 18 inch (450 mm) torpedo tubes, one in the bow, one either side amidships, and one in the stern; a total of eight torpedoes were carried. Group 1 boats were not fitted with a deck gun during construction, but those involved in the Dardanelles campaign had guns mounted forward of the conning tower while at Malta Dockyard.

E-Class submarines had wireless systems with 1 kilowatt (1.3 hp) power ratings; in some submarines, these were later upgraded to 3 kilowatts (4.0 hp) systems by removing a midship torpedo tube. Their maximum design depth was 100 feet (30 m) although in service some reached depths of below 200 feet (61 m).

== Service history ==
E5 experienced an engine room explosion on 8 June 1913, twenty days before commissioning, which resulted in thirteen deaths. A further three men were killed when there was an oil blow back into the starboard engine off St Ann's Head. The submarine depot ship HMS Adamant and Alligator carried the medical team out to meet E5 on her way into Pembroke Dock. Ten other men were seriously injured, although all civilian staff from Barrow were safe and unharmed.

In December 1913, E5 was part of the 8th Submarine Flotilla, based at Portsmouth as part of the Home Fleets

When war was declared with Germany on 5 August 1914, E5 broke off a refit to re-join 8th Submarine Flotilla at its war station in Harwich later that day.

The 8th Submarine Flotilla, including E5 was assigned to patrol in the east end of the English Channel during the passage of the British Expeditionary Force to France in early August. On 15–17 August 1914, the British Grand Fleet carried out a sweep in the North Sea towards Helgoland. E5 and sister submarine E7 were ordered to patrol off the mouth of the Weser river in support of this operation, while D2 and D3 patrolled off the Ems. On 16 August E5 encountered several German torpedo boats, which attacked E5, while the British submarine unsuccessfully attempted to torpedo one of the German ships. The next day a German submarine attempted to torpedo E5 which E5 managed to avoid before setting off for home. Early on the morning of 18 August, while still on their return journey, E5 and E7 spotted a four-funnelled cruiser. Believing that the unidentified ship was British, E5 challenged the cruiser, which provoked a violent response from what was actually the German cruiser Strassburg, which, with the cruiser Stralsund, was carrying out a sweep into the Hoofden in search for British blockading forces. Strassburg fired at the British submarines, which dived to safety.

In April 1915, E5 was deployed (along with E6, E8 and E12) to the German Bight to counter a suspected sortie by the German High Seas Fleet. On 14 April E5 torpedoed the German steamer Schwarzwald north of the Norderney lighthouse. German trawlers and aircraft drove off E5, allowing the damaged Schwarzwald to safely make port. E5's commanding officer, Lieutenant Commander C. S. Benning, was commended by the Admiralty for damaging Schwarzwald. On 3 May 1915 E5 was one of five British submarines lying off the German coast, when they were spotted by the German airship L9. The German airship dropped bombs on the British submarines, while E5 fired on L9 with her deck gun. E5 claimed to have hit L9 but the German airship was undamaged. L9 claimed to have sunk one of the British submarines, but while D4 was near-missed by L9's bombs, she too was undamaged.

On 25 September 1915 E5 torpedoed the German Sperrbrecher (auxiliary minesweeper) SP11, causing SP11 to be beached. Salvage attempts on the German ship were abandoned on 27 September. E5's crew was awarded prize money by the British Admiralty for the sinking of SP11.

== Loss ==
E5 was lost on 7 March 1916 while rescuing the survivors of the trawler Resono, just north of Juist in the North Sea.

There were different theories about the reason for the loss of E5. One theory was that she struck a mine, possibly after straying into a German minefield upon being sighted by the German light cruiser Regensburg. Another theory attributed her loss to depth charge attack by torpedo boats escorting the battlecruiser Seydlitz.

In 2016 divers found the wreck of E5 off the island of Schiermonnikoog. Her hatches were open, which suggests that the crew had tried to escape. There was no sign of damage to her hull, indicating that she had not sunk as a result of enemy action.
