= HMS Adamant (1911) =

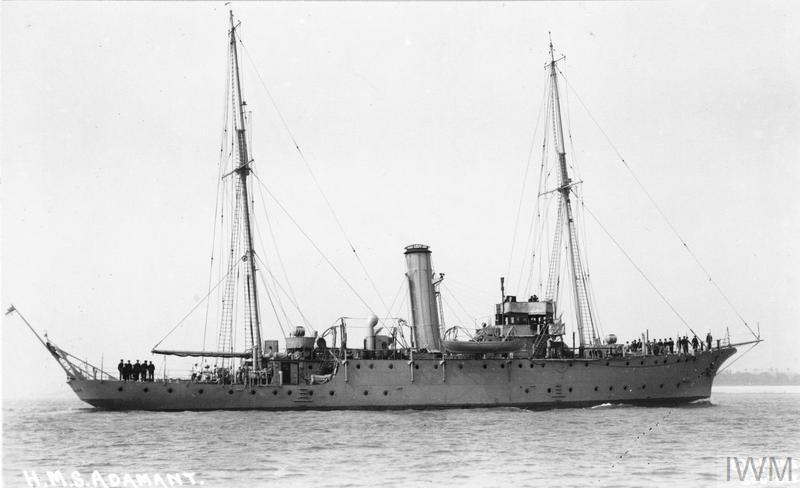
- Adamant

History

United Kingdom
- Name: HMS Adamant
- Ordered: 1910
- Builder: Cammell Laird, Birkenhead
- Launched: 12 July 1911
- Commissioned: 27 April 1912
- Decommissioned: 7 July 1932
- Honours and awards: Dardanelles 1915
- Fate: Sold 21 September 1932 for breaking by Rees, Llanelli

General characteristics
- Type: Submarine depot ship
- Displacement: 935 long tons (950 t) (normal load)
- Length: 212 ft (65 m)
- Beam: 32 ft 6 in (9.91 m)
- Draught: 12 ft 4 in (3.76 m) (deep load)
- Installed power: 1,400 shp (1,000 kW) Yarrow boilers
- Propulsion: 1 x triple-expansion steam engine 1 x shaft
- Speed: 14 knots (26 km/h; 16 mph)
- Range: 2,500 nmi (4,600 km; 2,900 mi) at 10 knots (19 km/h; 12 mph)
- Boats & landing craft carried: one 35 ft (11 m) motor boat one 30 ft (9.1 m) cutter one 27 ft (8.2 m) whaler two 16 ft (4.9 m) skiffs
- Complement: 63
- Notes: 180 long tons (180 t) of coal at deep load

HMS Adamant was a submarine depot ship of the Royal Navy. She was purpose built to support three of the new D-class submarines under the 1910/11 Naval Programme, allowing a small part of a flotilla to be deployed away from the main base.

== Service history ==
=== Pre-war ===
Adamant commissioned at Portsmouth on 27 April 1912, as an additional depot ship. Soon incorporated in the newly established 8th Submarine Flotilla. This was the offensive submarine force based in UK waters.

=== First World War ===
Adamant went with 8th Submarine Flotilla to its war station at Harwich in the 1914 mobilisation. On 3 November 1914 Adamant was sent to Yarmouth to act as depot for a detachment of the Flotilla, which was based there from this date. Her crew also established a permanent submarine base. The detachment left on 21 December 1914 and Adamant returned to Harwich.

Adamant was transferred for service as depot ship for the E-class submarines being sent to the Eastern Mediterranean Squadron for service at the Dardanelles, leaving Harwich on 27 March 1915 for the base at Mudros. In January 1916 Adamant moved to Brindisi as depot ship for the submarines of the Adriatic Squadron. She returned as depot for the submarines of the Eastern Mediterranean Squadron at Mudros in November 1916. In October 1917 she returned to the Adriatic Force as depot for submarines based at Govino (now Gouvia) on Corfu, moving back to Brindisi on 28 March 1918. She went through the Dardanelles as part of the Aegean Force on 11 November 1918 following the Turkish Armistice.

=== Fate ===
Adamant decommissioned from service on 7 July 1932. She was sold on 21 September 1932.

== Pennant numbers ==
Pennant Number	From	To
P37	6 December 1914	1 January 1918
P00	1 January 1918	Early 1919

== Sources ==
- Dittmar, F.J. & Colledge, J.J. (1972). British Warships 1914–1919. London: Ian Allan. ISBN 0-7110-0380-7.
- The National Archives: ADM 186/15: War Vessels and Aircraft (British and Foreign): Quarterly Return, Oct 1915
- The National Archives: ADM 53/16731, 32787-32822, 70016-70057: Logs of HMS Adamant
