= HMS D2 =

Submarine of the Royal Navy

- HMS D2

History

United Kingdom
- Name: HMS D2
- Builder: Vickers Armstrong, Barrow-in-Furness
- Laid down: 10 July 1909
- Launched: 25 May 1910
- Commissioned: 29 March 1911
- Fate: Sunk, 25 November 1914

General characteristics
- Class & type: D-class submarine
- Displacement: 483 long tons (491 t) (surfaced); 595 long tons (605 t) (submerged)
- Length: 163 ft (50 m) (o/a)
- Beam: 13.6 ft (4.1 m) (o/a)
- Installed power: 1,750 hp (1,300 kW) (diesel engines); 550 hp (410 kW) (electric motors)
- Propulsion: 2 × diesel engines; 2 × electric motors; 2 × screws
- Speed: Surfaced: 14 kn (16 mph; 26 km/h) Submerged: 10 kn (12 mph; 19 km/h) (design); 9 kn (10 mph; 17 km/h) (service)
- Range: 2,500 nmi (2,900 mi; 4,600 km) at 10 kn (12 mph; 19 km/h) (surfaced); 45 nmi (52 mi; 83 km) at 5 kn (5.8 mph; 9.3 km/h) (submerged)
- Complement: 25
- Armament: 3 × 18 inch (450 mm) torpedo tubes (2 forward, 1 stern)

HMS D2 was one of eight D-class submarine built for the Royal Navy during the first decade of the 20th century.

== Description ==
The D-class submarines were designed as improved and enlarged versions of the preceding C class, with diesel engines replacing the dangerous petrol engines used earlier. D2 was slightly smaller than her sister ships and had a length of 162 feet 1 inch (49.4 m) overall, a beam of 20 feet 6 inches (6.2 m) and a mean draught of 10 feet 10 inches (3.3 m). She displaced 489 long tons (497 t) on the surface and 603 long tons (613 t) submerged. The D-class submarines had a crew of 25 officers and ratings and were the first to adopt saddle tanks.

For surface running, the boats were powered by two 600-brake-horsepower (447 kW) diesels, each driving one propeller shaft. When submerged each propeller was driven by a 275-horsepower (205 kW) electric motor. They could reach 14 knots (26 km/h; 16 mph) on the surface and 9 knots (17 km/h; 10 mph) underwater. On the surface, the D class had a range of 2,500 nautical miles (4,600 km; 2,900 mi) at 10 knots (19 km/h; 12 mph).

The boats were armed with three 18-inch (45 cm) torpedo tubes, two in the bow and one in the stern. They carried one reload for each tube, a total of six torpedoes.

== Construction and career ==
D2 was laid down by Vickers on 10 July 1909 at their Barrow shipyard and commissioned on 29 March 1911. During her career, D2 returned from the second Heligoland Bight patrol along with D3, E5 and E7. On 28 August 1914, D2, D3 and D8 fought in the Battle of Heligoland Bight. Then, two days before D2 met her fate, Lieutenant Commander Jameson was washed overboard off Harwich. Lt. Cdr. Head was his replacement. D2 was rammed and sunk by a German patrol boat off Borkum on 25 November 1914, leaving no survivors.

== Coplestone Memorial Window, Chester ==
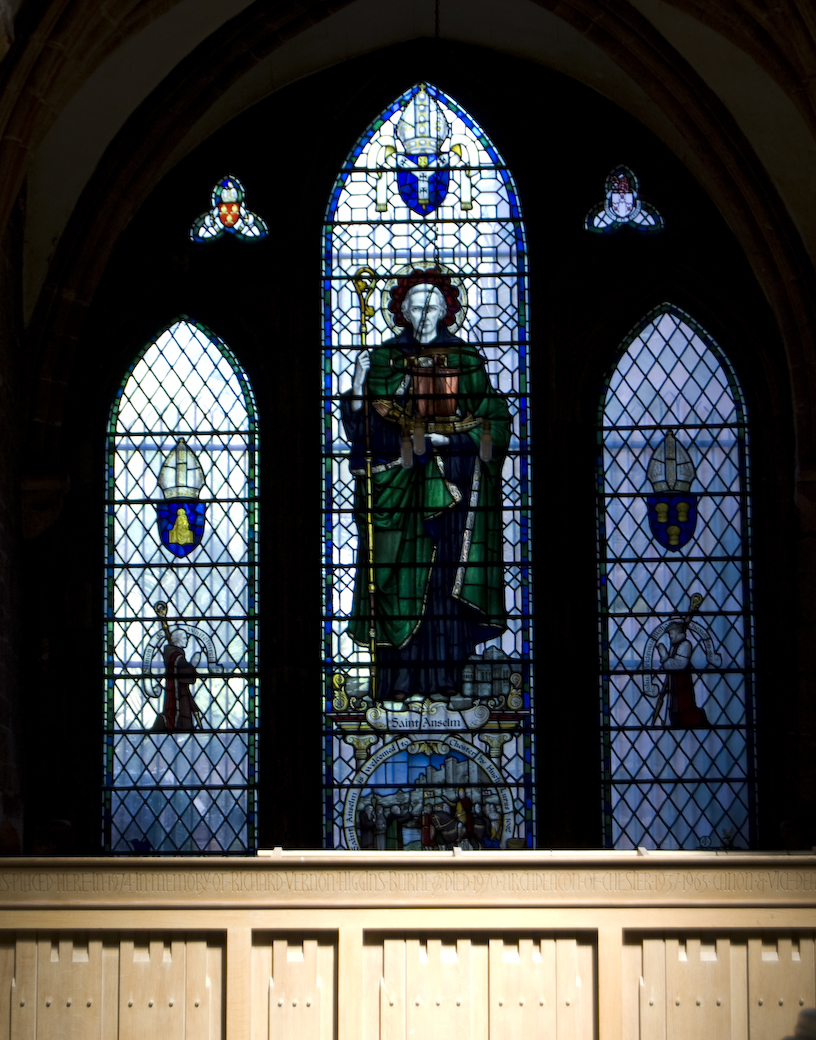
Coplestone Memorial Window in Chester Cathedral

The Coplestone Memorial Window in Chester Cathedral is in memory of "F. Lewis Coplestone, Lt-Commander, Royal Navy, HM Submarine D2" and Commander A.F. Coplesone-Boughey, RN, HMS Defence. It depicts St Anselm, Archbishop of Canterbury and shows at the bottom three coats of arms of the Coplestone family, which originated at the manor of Copleston in Devon.
