= HMS E4 =

Submarine of the Royal Navy

- HMS E4

History

United Kingdom
- Name: E4
- Builder: Vickers, Barrow
- Cost: £101,900
- Laid down: 16 May 1911
- Launched: 5 February 1912
- Commissioned: 28 January 1913
- Fate: Sold for scrapping, 21 February 1922

General characteristics
- Class & type: E-class submarine
- Displacement: 665 long tons (676 t) surfaced; 796 long tons (809 t) submerged
- Length: 178 ft (54 m)
- Beam: 15 ft 5 in (4.70 m)
- Propulsion: 2 × 800 hp (597 kW) diesel; 2 × 480 hp (358 kW) electric; 2 screws
- Speed: 15 knots (28 km/h; 17 mph) surfaced; 9.5 knots (17.6 km/h; 10.9 mph) submerged
- Range: 3,000 nmi (5,600 km) at 10 kn (19 km/h; 12 mph); 65 nmi (120 km) at 5 kn (9.3 km/h; 5.8 mph)
- Complement: 31
- Armament: 4 × 18 inch (450 mm) torpedo tubes (1 bow, 2 beam, 1 stern)

HMS E4 was a British E class submarine built by Vickers, Barrow-in-Furness, costing £101,900. E4 was laid down on 16 May 1911, launched on 5 February 1912 and commissioned on 28 January 1913. On 24 September 1915 E4 was attacked by the German airship SL3. On 15 August 1916, she collided with sister ship E41 during exercises off Harwich. Both ships sank and there were only 14 survivors, all from E41. Both boats were raised, repaired and recommissioned. She was sold on 21 February 1922 to the Upnor Ship Breaking Company.

== Design ==
The early British E-class submarines, from E1 to E8, had a displacement of 652 long tons (662 t) at the surface and 795 long tons (808 t) while submerged. They had a length overall of 180 feet (55 m) and a beam of 22 feet 8.5 inches (6.922 m), and were powered by two 800 horsepower (600 kW) Vickers eight-cylinder two-stroke diesel engines and two 420 horsepower (310 kW) electric motors. The class had a maximum surface speed of 16 knots (30 km/h; 18 mph) and a submerged speed of 10 knots (19 km/h; 12 mph), with a fuel capacity of 50 long tons (51 t) of diesel affording a range of 3,225 miles (5,190 km; 2,802 nmi) when travelling at 10 knots (19 km/h; 12 mph), while submerged they had a range of 85 miles (137 km; 74 nmi) at 5 knots (9.3 km/h; 5.8 mph).

The early 'Group 1' E class boats were armed with four 18 inch (450 mm) torpedo tubes, one in the bow, one either side amidships, and one in the stern; a total of eight torpedoes were carried. Group 1 boats were not fitted with a deck gun during construction, but those involved in the Dardanelles campaign had guns mounted forward of the conning tower while at Malta Dockyard.

E-Class submarines had wireless systems with 1 kilowatt (1.3 hp) power ratings; in some submarines, these were later upgraded to 3 kilowatts (4.0 hp) systems by removing a midship torpedo tube. Their maximum design depth was 100 feet (30 m) although in service some reached depths of below 200 feet (61 m). Some submarines contained Fessenden oscillator systems.

The complement was three officers and 28 men.

== Service history ==
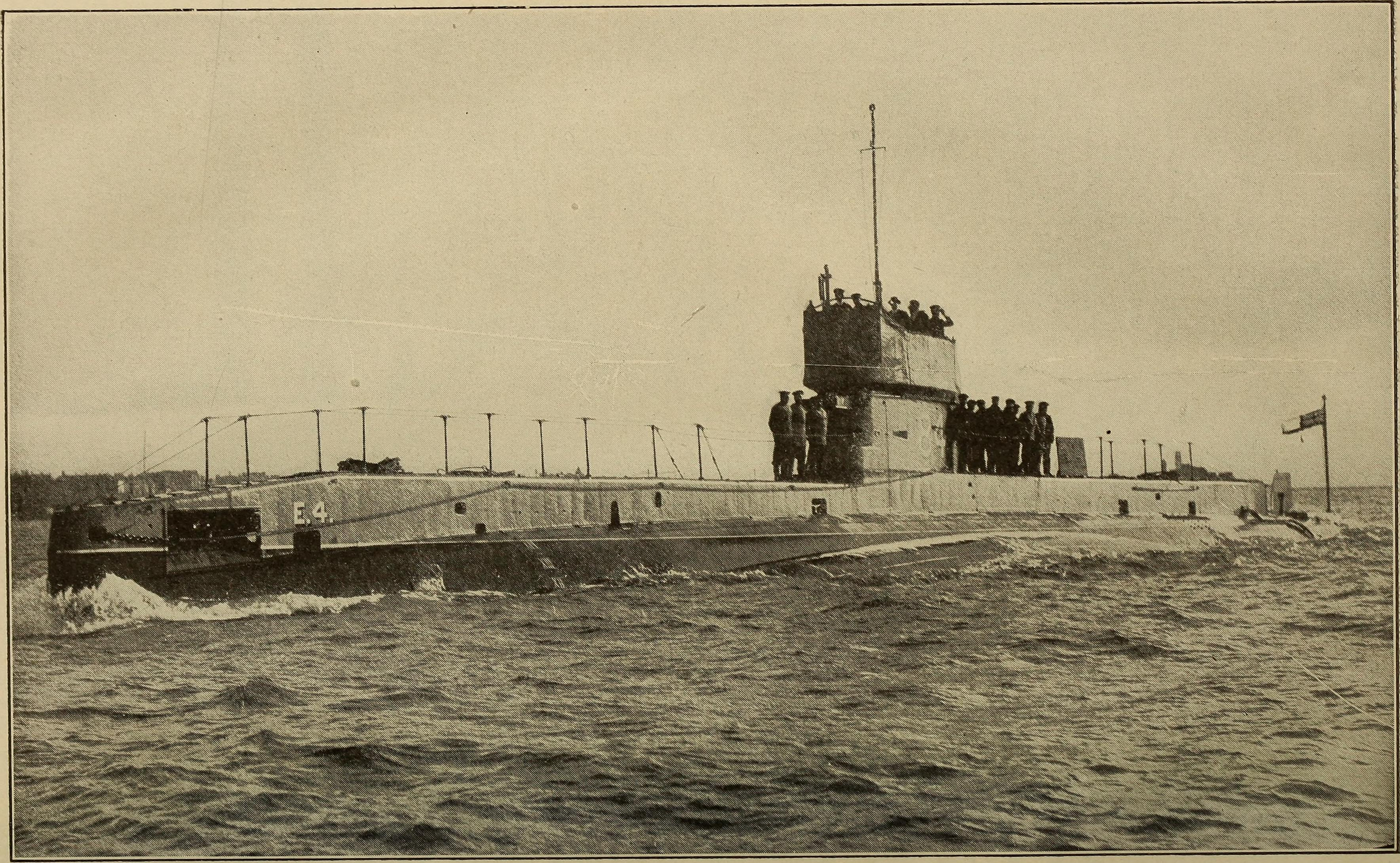
E4

On commissioning, E4 joined the 8th Submarine Flotilla as part of the Home Fleets, and was inspected by King George V at Portsmouth.

E4 remained part of the 8th Submarine Flotilla, based at Portsmouth on the eve of the outbreak of the First World War in August 1914. The planned duties of the 8th Flotilla in times of war was offensive operations in the North Sea, operating from Harwich, and the Flotilla was duly deployed to Harwich at the start of August. On 19 August, E4, together with the submarines E9 and D5 set out from Harwich for a patrol in the North Sea. On 20 August the three submarines were spotted by German torpedo boats west of Helgoland - the sighting resulted in a planned sortie by German cruisers and torpedo boats against British fishing boats on the Dogger Bank being delayed for a day.

On 28 August 1914, E4 was one of eight submarines that took part in a raid against the German Heligoland Bight patrol by the Harwich Force. Three submarines were deployed as bait, with orders to try and get spotted by the German outer screen in order to draw German torpedo boat patrols into the clutches of British destroyers and light cruisers. Meanwhile, E4, together with E9 and E5 were to patrol close to Helgoland. E4 spotted the German torpedo boat V187 being chased by British destroyers but could not get into a position to attack before V187 was sunk by the British destroyers. Shortly afterwards, the German cruiser Stettin arrived, forcing the British destroyers to disperse, and although E4 attempted to attack Stettin, the submarine could not get into a good attack position before Stettin left. A little later, E4 surfaced and picked up the crew of two boats from the destroyer Defender, which were rescuing survivors from V187 when the arrival of Stettin caused the boats to be left behind. E4, short of space, also picked up three German survivors, leaving the remainder in a boat with provisions and a compass. On 10 September, E4 took part in another raid by the Harwich Force, supported by the Grand Fleet against German forces in the Helgoland Bight. While the British surface forces found nothing, the submarines were more busy, with E4 encountering the German submarines U-23 and U-25. E-4 attempted to torpedo the German submarines, but both her torpedoes missed.

On 21 May 1915, E4 left Harwich to patrol North of Helgoland, to attack German minesweepers which were thought to be clearing a British minefield. E4 was attacked by the German airship L10 on 24 May, but the attack was unsuccessful. Also on 24 May, E4 fired a pair of torpedoes at long range against a patrol of German torpedo boats, with the torpedoes missing. On 29 May, during E4's journey home, she was attacked unsuccessfully by a German seaplane. On 24 July, E4 set out on a patrol off the Horns Reef, and later that day sighted a submarine near the North Hinder lightvessel. E4 fired one torpedo at the submarine, ran under the German submarine, which dived away. On 28 July E4 was attacked off Horns Reef by two German Vorpostenboot, Senator von Berenburg Goszler and Harry Busse. E4 responded by torpedoing and sinking Berenburg. E4 picked up 11 survivors from the sunken trawler, taking three of them prisoner, and landing the others on the Horns Reef lightvessel.

In September 1915, E4 was one of a number of submarines fitted with four 6-pounder anti-aircraft guns for use against German airships. On 1 September, E4 and E6 set out from Harwich to the Western side of the German Bight on an anti-Zeppelin patrol. While E4 saw no German airships on that patrol, she did capture the German trawler Esteburg which was sent back to Harwich. On 14 September, E4 and E6 set out on another anti-Zeppelin patrol. On 21 September, (Note: 31 September according to the Naval Staff Monograph.) E4 encountered the German airship SL 3. E4 opened fire on the airship with her anti-aircraft guns, but this did not deter SL 3, and E4 dived to safety just before the airship dropped three bombs. Both submarine and airship were undamaged. On 2 April 1916, E4, one of three submarines searching for the destroyer Medusa, which was adrift at sea after being abandoned earlier that month, encountered a German submarine but failed to close to an attack position. E4, by now fitted with two 3-inch (76 mm) anti-aircraft guns, continued to carry out anti-Zeppelin patrols in May 1916, being near-missed by two bombs dropped by a German airship on 20 May.

On 15 August 1916, submarines of the 8th Submarine Flotilla were training off Harwich, with E41 acting as a target to allow the other submarines to practice attacking submarines. E41 was running on the surface at 12 kn (14 mph; 22 km/h) when the submerged E4 passed in front of E41. Although E41's crew saw E4's periscope and attempted evasive action, E4 rammed E41 and sank immediately with the loss of all 33 aboard, while E41 sank within 90 seconds, with 18 killed and 15 rescued by the destroyer Firedrake. Both submarines were salvaged and returned to service, with E4 being listed as part of the 9th Submarine Flotilla, also based at Harwich, from October 1916. E4 remained part of the 9th Flotilla until the end of the war, although she was noted as being paid off in December 1918.

E4 was sold for scrap to the Upnor Ship Breaking Company of Upnor on 21 February 1922.

== Bibliography ==
- Hutchinson, Robert (2001). Jane's submarines : war beneath the waves from 1776 to the present day. London: HarperCollins. ISBN 9780007105588.
- Preston, Antony (2001). The Royal Navy submarine service : a centennial history. London: Conway Maritime. ISBN 978-0851778914.
- Akerman, P. (1989). Encyclopaedia of British submarines 1901–1955. Maritime Books. ISBN 1-904381-05-7.
- Colledge, J. J.; Warlow, Ben (2006) [1969]. Ships of the Royal Navy: The Complete Record of All Fighting Ships of the Royal Navy from the 15th Century to the Present (3rd Rev ed.). London: Chatham Publishing. ISBN 978-1-86176-281-8. OCLC 67375475.
- Corbett, Julian S. (1920). Naval Operations: Vol. I: To The Battle of the Falklands December 1914. History of the Great War. London: Longmans, Green & Co.
- Dittmar, F. J.; Colledge, J. J. (1972). British Warships 1914–1919. Shepperton, UK: Ian Allan. ISBN 0-7110-0380-7.
- Groos, O. (1924). Der Krieg in der Nordsee: Vierter Band: Von Unfang Februar bis Dezember 1915. Der Krieg zur See: 1914–1918. Berlin: Verlag von E. S. Mittler und Sohn – via National Library of Estonia.
- Kemp, Paul (1999). The Admiralty Regrets: British Warship Losses of the 20th Century. Stroud, UK: Sutton Publishing. ISBN 0-7509-1567-6.
- McCartney, Innes; Bryan, Tony (20 February 2013). British Submarines of World War I. Osprey Publishing. ISBN 978-1-4728-0035-0.
- Massie, Robert K. (2007). Castles of Steel: Britain, Germany and the Winning of the War at Sea. London: Vintage Books. ISBN 978-0-099-52378-9.
- Monograph No. 11: The Battle of the Heligoland Bight, August 28th, 1914 (PDF). Naval Staff Monographs (Historical). Vol. III. Naval Staff, Training and Staff Duties Division. 1921. pp. 108–166.
- Monograph No. 23: Home Waters Part I: From the Outbreak of War to 27 August 1914 (PDF). Naval Staff Monographs (Historical). Vol. X. Naval Staff, Training and Staff Duties Division. 1924.
- Monograph No. 24: Home Waters Part II: September and October 1914 (PDF). Naval Staff Monographs (Historical). Vol. XI. Naval Staff, Training and Staff Duties Division. 1924.
- Monograph No. 29: Home Waters Part IV: From February to July 1915 (PDF). Naval Staff Monographs (Historical). Vol. XIII. Naval Staff, Training and Staff Duties Division. 1925.
- Monograph No. 30: Home Waters Part V: From July to October 1915 (PDF). Naval Staff Monographs (Historical). Vol. XIV. Naval Staff, Training and Staff Duties Division. 1926.
- Monograph No. 31: Home Waters Part VI: From October 1915 to May 1916 (PDF). Naval Staff Monographs (Historical). Vol. XV. Naval Staff, Training and Staff Duties Division. 1926.
- Monograph No. 33: Home Waters Part VII: From June 1916 to November 1916 (PDF). Naval Staff Monographs (Historical). Vol. XVII. Naval Staff, Training and Staff Duties Division. 1927.
