= HMS E6 =

Ship

- HMS E6

History

United Kingdom
- Name: E6
- Builder: Vickers, Barrow
- Cost: £106,900
- Laid down: 12 November 1911
- Launched: 12 November 1912
- Commissioned: 17 October 1913
- Fate: Sunk by mine, 26 December 1915

General characteristics
- Class & type: E-class submarine
- Displacement: 652 long tons (662 t) surfaced; 795 long tons (808 t) submerged
- Length: 178 ft (54 m)
- Beam: 15 ft 5 in (4.70 m)
- Propulsion: 2 × 800 hp (597 kW) diesel; 2 × 420 hp (313 kW) electric; 2 screws
- Speed: 15 knots (28 km/h; 17 mph) surfaced; 9.5 knots (17.6 km/h; 10.9 mph) submerged
- Range: 3,000 nmi (5,600 km) at 10 kn (19 km/h; 12 mph); 65 nmi (120 km) at 5 kn (9.3 km/h; 5.8 mph)
- Complement: 31
- Armament: 4 × 18-inch (457 mm) torpedo tubes (1 bow, 2 beam, 1 stern)

HMS E6 was a British E-class submarine built by Vickers Barrow-in-Furness. She was laid down on 12 November 1911 and was commissioned on 17 October 1913. She cost £106,900.

== Design ==
The early British E-class submarines, from E1 to E8, had a displacement of 652 long tons (662 t) at the surface and 795 long tons (808 t) while submerged. They had a length overall of 180 feet (55 m) and a beam of 22 feet 8.5 inches (6.922 m), and were powered by two 800 horsepower (600 kW) Vickers eight-cylinder two-stroke diesel engines and two 420 horsepower (310 kW) electric motors. The class had a maximum surface speed of 16 knots (30 km/h; 18 mph) and a submerged speed of 10 knots (19 km/h; 12 mph), with a fuel capacity of 50 long tons (51 t) of diesel affording a range of 3,225 miles (5,190 km; 2,802 nmi) when travelling at 10 knots (19 km/h; 12 mph), while submerged they had a range of 85 miles (137 km; 74 nmi) at 5 knots (9.3 km/h; 5.8 mph).

The early 'Group 1' E class boats were armed with four 18 inch (450 mm) torpedo tubes, one in the bow, one either side amidships, and one in the stern; a total of eight torpedoes were carried. Group 1 boats were not fitted with a deck gun during construction, but those involved in the Dardanelles campaign had guns mounted forward of the conning tower while at Malta Dockyard.

E-Class submarines had wireless systems with 1 kilowatt (1.3 hp) power ratings; in some submarines, these were later upgraded to 3 kilowatts (4.0 hp) systems by removing a midship torpedo tube. Their maximum design depth was 100 feet (30 m) although in service some reached depths of below 200 feet (61 m).

== Crew ==
Her complement was three officers and 28 men.

== Service history ==
When war was declared with Germany on 5 August 1914, E6 was based at Harwich, in the 8th Submarine Flotilla of the Home Fleets.

That morning she was towed by the light cruiser Amethyst to Terschelling along with E8 which was towed by the destroyer Ariel. E6 and E8 then made the first Heligoland Bight patrol. On 28 August 1914, E6 was one of eight submarines that took part in a raid against the German Heligoland Bight patrol using surface ships. E6, together with E7 and E8 were deployed as bait, with orders to try and get spotted in order to draw German destroyer patrols into the clutches of British destroyers and light cruisers of the Harwich Force. Later in the day, when the light cruisers of the 1st Light Cruiser Squadron came up to support the British surface forces, they spotted E6 and, mistaking her for a German submarine, tried to ram her. On 25 September 1914, E6 fouled a mine on her hydroplane guard when on patrol in the Heligoland Bight, but managed to free herself and escape.

On 13 April 1915 E6, on patrol near Juist, spotted a German submarine, but was unable to get into position to deliver an attack. The next day she fired a torpedo at the German torpedo boat S168, but the torpedo missed. On 29 May 1915 E6 was one of a number of submarines ordered to sea in response to a sortie into the North Sea by the German High Seas Fleet. She spotted the German fleet on 30 May and fired a single torpedo at the German battlecruiser Moltke. E6's captain incorrectly estimated Moltke's speed, and the torpedo missed. German torpedo boats forced E6 to dive and prevented a second attack. On 1 September 1915 E6 and E8, which had been fitted with 4 six-pounder anti-aircraft guns each set out to the Bight to carry out anti-Zeppelin patrols. On 4 September E6 spotted the airship L9 and opened fire, but no hits were scored and E6 was forced to dive by the approach of an aeroplane. On 23 October E6 fired 30 shots at the German airship L7 when on patrol off Horns Rev. The airship was undamaged. That evening the German High Seas Fleet again sortied from Kiel. E6 spotted the German fleet on the morning of 24 October. E6 launched two attacks on German light cruisers, both of which were unsuccessful, although E6's crew did hear two explosions after the second attack, on the cruiser Rostock.

E6 was mined on 26 December 1915 with the loss of all hands in the North Sea off Harwich. A trawler had been sunk by a mine in the same position shortly before, and a British torpedo boat signalled E6 to avoid the minefield, but E6 ignored the warning and was lost.
