= HMS E7 =

Submarine of the Royal Navy

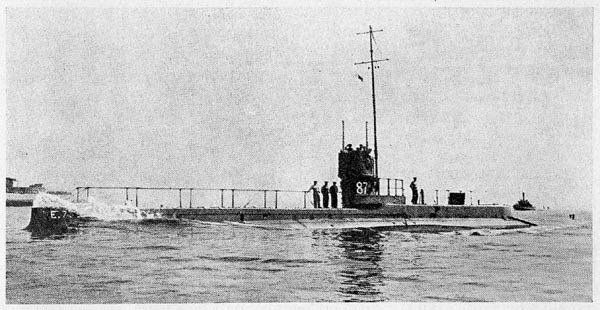
- HMS E7

History

United Kingdom
- Name: E7
- Builder: HM Dockyard, Chatham
- Cost: £105,700
- Laid down: 30 March 1912
- Launched: 2 October 1913
- Commissioned: 16 March 1914
- Fate: Scuttled, 4 September 1915

General characteristics
- Class & type: E-class submarine
- Displacement: 652 long tons (662 t) surfaced; 795 long tons (808 t) submerged
- Length: 178 ft (54 m)
- Beam: 15 ft 5 in (4.70 m)
- Propulsion: 2 × 800 hp (597 kW) diesel; 2 × 480 hp (358 kW) electric; 2 screws
- Speed: 15 knots (28 km/h; 17 mph) surfaced; 9.5 knots (17.6 km/h; 10.9 mph) submerged
- Range: 3,000 nmi (5,600 km) at 10 kn (19 km/h; 12 mph); 65 nmi (120 km) at 5 kn (9.3 km/h; 5.8 mph)
- Complement: 31
- Armament: 4 × 18 inch (450 mm) torpedo tubes (1 bow, 2 beam, 1 stern)

HMS E7 was a British E class submarine built at Chatham Dockyard. She was laid down on 30 March 1912 and was commissioned on 16 March 1914. She cost £105,700.

== Design ==
The early British E-class submarines, from E1 to E8, had a displacement of 652 long tons (662 t) at the surface and 795 long tons (808 t) while submerged. They had a length overall of 180 feet (55 m) and a beam of 22 feet 8.5 inches (6.922 m), and were powered by two 800 horsepower (600 kW) Vickers eight-cylinder two-stroke diesel engines and two 420 horsepower (310 kW) electric motors. The class had a maximum surface speed of 16 knots (30 km/h; 18 mph) and a submerged speed of 10 knots (19 km/h; 12 mph), with a fuel capacity of 50 long tons (51 t) of diesel affording a range of 3,225 miles (5,190 km; 2,802 nmi) when travelling at 10 knots (19 km/h; 12 mph), while submerged they had a range of 85 miles (137 km; 74 nmi) at 5 knots (9.3 km/h; 5.8 mph).

The early 'Group 1' E class boats were armed with four 18 inch (450 mm) torpedo tubes, one in the bow, one either side amidships, and one in the stern; a total of eight torpedoes were carried. Group 1 boats were not fitted with a deck gun during construction, but those involved in the Dardanelles campaign had guns mounted forward of the conning tower while at Malta Dockyard.

E-Class submarines had wireless systems with 1 kilowatt (1.3 hp) power ratings; in some submarines, these were later upgraded to 3 kilowatts (4.0 hp) systems by removing a midship torpedo tube. Their maximum design depth was 100 feet (30 m) although in service some reached depths of below 200 feet (61 m).

== Crew ==
Her complement was three officers and 28 men.

== Service history ==
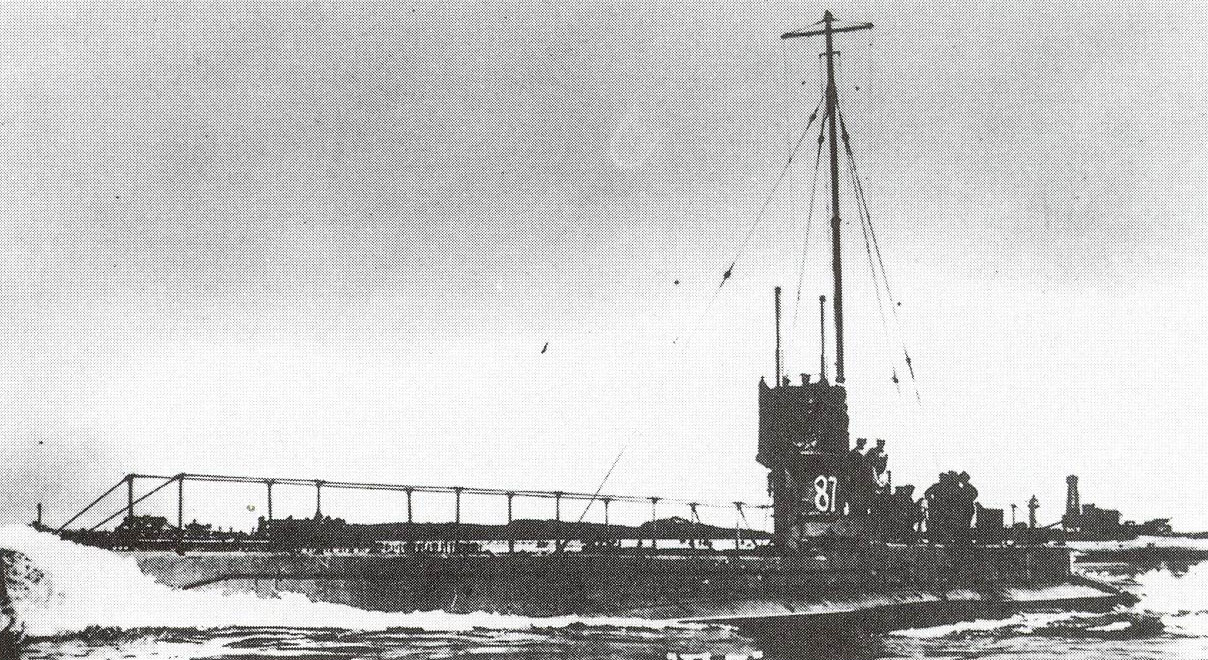

When war was declared with Germany on 5 August 1914, E7 was based at Harwich, in the 8th Submarine Flotilla of the Home Fleets.

E7 took part in the Second Heligoland Bight Patrol along with E5, D2 and D3. She and the other submarines returned from the patrol on 18 August 1914. Then on 30 June 1915, E7 began a 24-day patrol in the Sea of Marmara. She succeeded in sinking 13 ships and damaging many more.

The German Submarine UB-14 was in port of Chanak to await repairs. While there on 4 September, word came that E7 was entangled in Ottoman antisubmarine nets off Nagara Point, which the Ottoman battleship Turgut Reis had laid.

The U-boat′s commander, Oberleutnant zur See Heino von Heimburg, and UB-14's cook, a man by the name of Herzig, set out in a rowboat to observe the Ottoman attempts to destroy E7. After several mines that formed part of the net had been detonated to no avail, (Note: The type of net in use had electric contact mines that were triggered from the shore. See: Stern: p. 29.) von Heimburg and his group rowed out and repeatedly dropped a plumb line until it contacted metal. Then, von Heimburg dropped an Ottoman sinker mine with a shortened fuse right on top of E7. After the hand-dropped mine detonated too close for the British submarine's captain's comfort, he ordered his boat surfaced, abandoned, and scuttled. Between shellfire from the Ottoman shore batteries and E7′s scuttling charges, von Heimburg and company narrowly escaped harm. While most sources credit E7′s sinking to the Ottoman efforts, author Robert Stern contends that von Heimburg and UB-14 deserve partial credit for the demise of E7.
