= HMS D8 =

Submarine of the Royal Navy

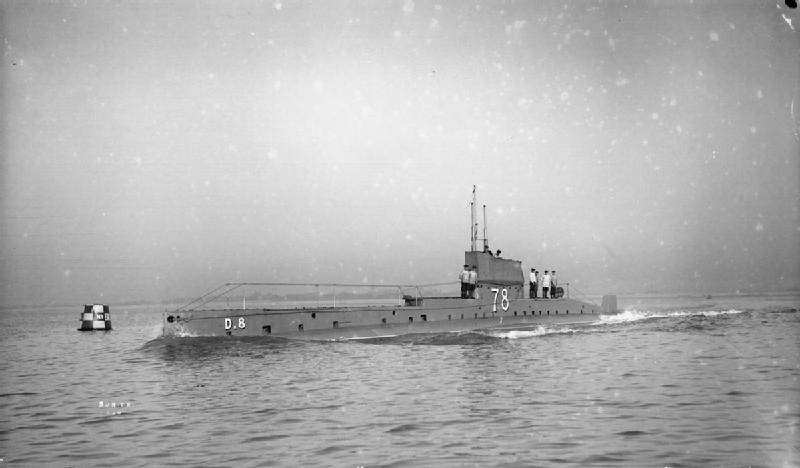
- HMS D8

History

United Kingdom
- Name: HMS D8
- Builder: Vickers Armstrong, Barrow-in-Furness
- Laid down: 14 February 1910
- Launched: 23 September 1911
- Commissioned: 23 March 1912
- Fate: Sold 19 December 1921 to H. Pounds

General characteristics
- Class & type: D-class submarine
- Displacement: Surfaced 483 tons; Submerged 595 tons
- Length: 163.0 ft (49.7 m) (oa)
- Beam: 13.6 ft (4.1 m) (oa)
- Propulsion: 550 hp (410 kW) electric 1,750 hp (1,300 kW) diesel twin screws
- Speed: Surfaced=*14.0 knots (25.9 km/h; 16.1 mph); Submerged = 10.0 knots (18.5 km/h; 11.5 mph) (design) 9.0 knots (16.7 km/h; 10.4 mph) (service)
- Range: Surface=*2,500 nautical miles (4,600 km; 2,900 mi) at 10 knots (19 km/h; 12 mph); Submerged=45 nautical miles (83 km; 52 mi) at 5 knots (9.3 km/h; 5.8 mph)
- Complement: 25
- Armament: 3 x 18-inch (46 cm) torpedo tubes (2 forward, one aft)

HMS D8 was one of eight D-class submarines built for the Royal Navy during the first decade of the 20th century.

== Description ==
The D-class submarines were designed as improved and enlarged versions of the preceding C class, with diesel engines replacing the dangerous petrol engines used earlier. D3 and subsequent boats were slightly larger than the earlier boats. They had a length of 164 feet 7 inches (50.2 m) overall, a beam of 20 feet 5 inches (6.2 m) and a mean draught of 11 feet 5 inches (3.5 m). They displaced 495 long tons (503 t) on the surface and 620 long tons (630 t) submerged. The D-class submarines had a crew of 25 officers and ratings and were the first to adopt saddle tanks.

For surface running, the boats were powered by two 600-brake-horsepower (447 kW) diesels, each driving one propeller shaft. When submerged each propeller was driven by a 275-horsepower (205 kW) electric motor. They could reach 14 knots (26 km/h; 16 mph) on the surface and 9 knots (17 km/h; 10 mph) underwater. On the surface, the D class had a range of 2,500 nautical miles (4,600 km; 2,900 mi) at 10 knots (19 km/h; 12 mph).

The boats were armed with three 18-inch (45 cm) torpedo tubes, two in the bow and one in the stern. They carried one reload for each tube, a total of six torpedoes.

== Construction and career ==
D8 was laid down on 14 February 1910 by Chatham Dockyard. The submarine was launched on 23 September 1911 and was commissioned on 23 March 1912.

D8 fought in the Battle of Heligoland Bight on 28 August 1914 along with sister ships D2 and D3. Then on 18 October 1914, D8 shadowed the Ophelia which was judged to be spying and was interned.

D8 was sold on 19 December 1921 to Pounds.
