= Medea-class destroyer =

World War I class of Greek navy destroyers

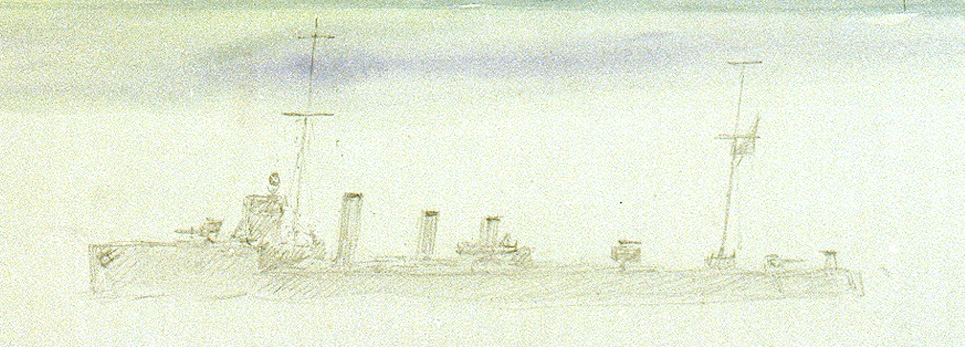
- 'Medea'-class destroyer

Class overview
- Builders: John Brown & Company; Fairfield Shipbuilding and Engineering Company
- Operators: Royal Navy
- Built: 1914–1915
- In commission: 1915–1921
- Completed: 4
- Lost: 1

General characteristics
- Type: Destroyer
- Displacement: 1,040 long tons (1,060 t)
- Length: 273 ft 6 in (83.4 m)
- Beam: 26 ft 6 in (8.1 m)
- Draught: 10 ft 6 in (3.2 m)
- Installed power: Yarrow boilers; 25,000 shp (19,000 kW)
- Propulsion: 3 shafts; steam turbines
- Speed: 32 kn (59 km/h; 37 mph)
- Complement: 80
- Armament: 3 × single 4 in (102 mm) guns; 1 × single 2 pdr 40 mm (1.6 in), AA gun; 2 × twin 21 in (533 mm) torpedo tubes

The Medea class were a class of destroyers that were being built for the Greek Navy at the outbreak of World War I but were taken over and completed for the Royal Navy for wartime service. All were named after characters from Greek mythology as result of their Greek heritage.

The Medeas were a private design roughly similar to their various Royal Navy M-class contemporaries. They had three funnels, the foremost of which was taller, and unusually, the mainmast was taller than the foremast, giving rise to a distinctive appearance. They shipped three single QF 4 inch guns, one on the forecastle, one between the first two funnels and the third on the quarterdeck.

== Ships ==
Name	Ship Builder	Laid down	Launched	Completed	Fate
Medea (ex-Kriti)	John Brown & Company, Clydebank	8 April 1914	30 January 1915	May 1915	Sold for breaking up, 9 May 1921
Medusa (ex-Lesbos)	John Brown, Clydebank	1914	27 March 1915	1915	Rammed and sunk by HMS Laverock off of Schleswig, 25 March 1916
Melampus (ex-Chios)	Fairfield Shipbuilding and Engineering Company, Govan	1914	16 December 1914	29 June 1915	Sold for breaking up, 22 September 1921
Melpomene (ex-Samos)	Fairfield, Govan	1914	1 February 1915	16 August 1915,	Sold for breaking up, 9 May 1921

== Bibliography ==
- Colledge, J. J.; Warlow, Ben & Bush, Steve (2020). Ships of the Royal Navy: The Complete Record of all Fighting Ships of the Royal Navy from the 15th Century to the Present (5th revised and updated ed.). Seaforth Publishing. ISBN 978-1-5267-9327-0.
- Friedman, Norman (2009). British Destroyers From Earliest Days to the Second World War. Naval Institute Press. ISBN 978-1-59114-081-8.
- March, Edgar J. (1966). British Destroyers: A History of Development, 1892–1953; Drawn by Admiralty Permission From Official Records & Returns, Ships' Covers & Building Plans. Seeley Service. OCLC 164893555.
- Destroyers of the Royal Navy, 1893-1981, Maurice Cocker, 1983, Ian Allan ISBN 0-7110-1075-7
- Jane's Fighting Ships, 1919, Jane's Publishing
- Preston, Antony (1985). "Great Britain and Empire Forces". In Gray, Randal (ed.). Conway's All the World's Fighting Ships 1906–1921. Naval Institute Press. pp. 1–104. ISBN 0-85177-245-5.
