= HMS E41 =

Submarine of the Royal Navy

History

United Kingdom
- Name: E41
- Builder: Cammell Laird, Birkenhead
- Laid down: 26 July 1915
- Launched: 22 October 1915
- Commissioned: February 1916
- Fate: Sold, 6 September 1922

General characteristics
- Class & type: E-class submarine
- Displacement: 662 long tons (673 t) surfaced; 807 long tons (820 t) submerged
- Length: 181 ft (55 m)
- Beam: 15 ft (4.6 m)
- Propulsion: 2 × 800 hp (597 kW) diesel; 2 × 420 hp (313 kW) electric; 2 screws
- Speed: 15 knots (28 km/h; 17 mph) surfaced; 10 knots (19 km/h; 12 mph) submerged
- Range: 3,000 nmi (5,600 km) at 10 kn (19 km/h; 12 mph) surfaced; 65 nmi (120 km) at 5 kn (9.3 km/h; 5.8 mph) surfaced
- Complement: 31
- Armament: 5 × 18 inch (450 mm) torpedo tubes (2 bow, 2 beam, 1 stern); 1 × 12-pounder gun

HMS E41 was a British E-class submarine built by Cammell Laird, Birkenhead. She was laid down on 26 July 1915 and was commissioned in February 1916.

== Design ==
Like all post-E8 British E-class submarines, E41 had a displacement of 662 long tons (673 t) at the surface and 807 long tons (820 t) while submerged. She had a total length of 180 feet (55 m) and a beam of 22 feet 8.5 inches (6.922 m). She was powered by two 800 horsepower (600 kW) Vickers eight-cylinder two-stroke diesel engines and two 420 horsepower (310 kW) electric motors. The submarine had a maximum surface speed of 16 knots (30 km/h; 18 mph) and a submerged speed of 10 knots (19 km/h; 12 mph). British E-class submarines had fuel capacities of 50 long tons (51 t) of diesel and ranges of 3,255 miles (5,238 km; 2,829 nmi) when travelling at 10 knots (19 km/h; 12 mph). E41 was capable of operating submerged for five hours when travelling at 5 knots (9.3 km/h; 5.8 mph).

E41 was armed with a 12-pounder 76 mm (3.0 in) QF gun mounted forward of the conning tower. She had five 18 inch (450 mm) torpedo tubes, two in the bow, one either side amidships, and one in the stern; a total of 10 torpedoes were carried.

E-Class submarines had wireless systems with 1 kilowatt (1.3 hp) power ratings; in some submarines, these were later upgraded to 3 kilowatts (4.0 hp) systems by removing a midship torpedo tube. Their maximum design depth was 100 feet (30 m) although in service some reached depths of below 200 feet (61 m). Some submarines contained Fessenden oscillator systems.

== Service history ==
HMS E41 collided with E4 on the surface during exercises off Harwich on 15 August 1916. Sixteen crewmembers were lost, but fifteen escaped including seven from the bottom. Six crewmembers trapped in the submarine as she sank were able to escape by waiting under the conning-tower until the air pressure building up as the submarine sank blew the hatch open and allowed them to float to the surface. Chief Petty Officer William Brown was left behind, but was eventually able to escape from the engine room after an hour and a half in the sunken submarine.

HMS E41 was raised in September 1917 and was recommissioned. She was sold in Newcastle on 6 September 1922.
