= HMS E22 =

Submarine of the Royal Navy

History

United Kingdom
- Name: E22
- Builder: Vickers, Barrow
- Laid down: 27 August 1914
- Launched: 27 August 1915
- Commissioned: 8 November 1915
- Fate: Torpedoed and sunk 25 April 1916

General characteristics
- Class & type: E-class submarine
- Displacement: 662 long tons (673 t) surfaced; 807 long tons (820 t) submerged
- Length: 181 ft (55 m)
- Beam: 15 ft (4.6 m)
- Propulsion: 2 × 800 hp (597 kW) diesel; 2 × 420 hp (313 kW) electric; 2 screws
- Speed: 15 knots (28 km/h; 17 mph) surfaced; 10 knots (19 km/h; 12 mph) submerged
- Range: 3,000 nmi (5,600 km) at 10 kn (19 km/h; 12 mph) surfaced; 65 nmi (120 km) at 5 kn (9.3 km/h; 5.8 mph) submerged
- Complement: 30
- Armament: 5 × 18-inch (450 mm) torpedo tubes (2 bow, 2 beam, 1 stern); 1 × 12-pounder gun

HMS E22 was a British E-class submarine built by Vickers, Barrow-in-Furness. She was laid down on 27 August 1914 and was commissioned on 8 November 1915.

== Design ==
Like all post-E8 British E-class submarines, E22 had a displacement of 662 long tons (673 t) at the surface and 807 long tons (820 t) while submerged. She had a total length of 180 feet (55 m) and a beam of 22 feet 8.5 inches (6.922 m). She was powered by two 800 horsepower (600 kW) Vickers eight-cylinder two-stroke diesel engines and two 420 horsepower (310 kW) electric motors. The submarine had a maximum surface speed of 16 knots (30 km/h; 18 mph) and a submerged speed of 10 knots (19 km/h; 12 mph). British E-class submarines had fuel capacities of 50 long tons (51 t) of diesel and ranges of 3,255 miles (5,238 km; 2,829 nmi) when travelling at 10 knots (19 km/h; 12 mph). E21 was capable of operating submerged for five hours when travelling at 5 knots (9.3 km/h; 5.8 mph).

E22 was armed with five 18-inch (450 mm) torpedo tubes, two in the bow, one either side amidships, and one in the stern; a total of 10 torpedoes were carried.

E-Class submarines had wireless systems with 1 kilowatt (1.3 hp) power ratings; in some submarines, these were later upgraded to 3 kilowatts (4.0 hp) systems by removing a midship torpedo tube. Their maximum design depth was 100 feet (30 m) although in service some reached depths of below 200 feet (61 m). Some submarines contained Fessenden oscillator systems.

== Crew ==
Her complement was three officers and 28 men.

== Service history ==
E22 was involved in experiments in the North Sea to intercept Zeppelins on 24 April 1916. E22 carried two Sopwith Baby seaplane scouts on her casing. The boat would then submerge in calm waters and the planes would float on the surface. They would then take off and then return to the East coast of England at Felixstowe. The trials were not repeated.

E22 was torpedoed by the German U-boat UB-18 off Great Yarmouth in the North Sea on 25 April 1916. There were two survivors, ERA F.S. Buckingham and Signalman William Harrod, taken prisoner by the U-boat.

== Wreck ==
HMS E22 wreck has been located, this information comes from HeritageGateway.org.uk site

During the survey, the high-resolution bathymetry images revealed the wreck of a submarine, located around 70 km off the coast of East Anglia. The vessel was lying, totally uncovered, on the seabed, in around 35m of water. The structure was almost intact, with the hull broken just behind the conning tower. Due to its location, it was identified as wreck ID 28012 on the Admiralty database. (5)

Identified as HMS E22 following a commercial seabed survey in 2022. Using Historic England’s deskGIS and Google Earth systems, the location has been identified as approximately 50 nautical miles east of Great Yarmouth. (12)

== Bibliography ==
- Hutchinson, Robert (2001). Jane's Submarines: War Beneath the Waves from 1776 to the Present Say. London: HarperCollins. ISBN 978-0-00-710558-8. OCLC 53783010.
