= HMS D1 =

Submarine of the Royal Navy

Coordinates: 50°19′58″N 3°29′58″W

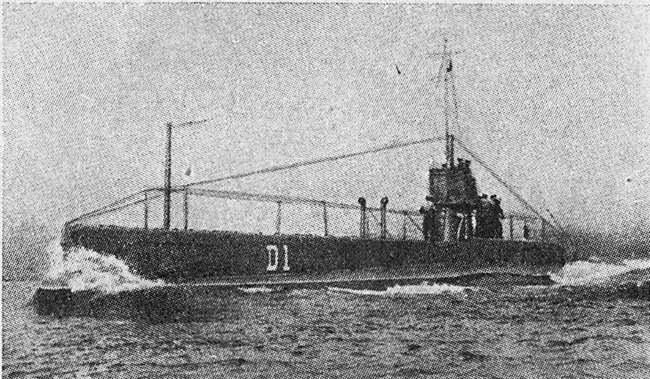
- HMS D1

History

United Kingdom
- Name: HMS D1
- Builder: Vickers Armstrong, Barrow-in-Furness
- Laid down: 14 May 1907
- Launched: 16 May 1908
- Commissioned: September 1909
- Fate: Sunk (as a target) on 23 October 1918

General characteristics
- Class & type: D-class submarine
- Displacement: Surfaced= 483 tons / Submerged= 595 tons
- Length: 163.0 ft (49.7 m) (oa)
- Beam: 13.6 ft (4.1 m) (oa)
- Propulsion: 550 hp electric 1750 hp diesel twin screws
- Speed: Surfaced=14.0 kn / Dived= 10.0 (design) 9.0 (service)
- Range: Surface= 2500 nmi at 10 kn / Submerged=45 nmi at 5 kn
- Complement: 25
- Armament: 3 × 18 in (45 cm) torpedo tubes (2 bow, 1 stern)

HMS D1 was one of eight D-class submarine built for the Royal Navy during the first decade of the 20th century.

== Description ==
The D-class submarines were designed as improved and enlarged versions of the preceding C class, with diesel engines replacing the dangerous petrol engines used earlier. The submarines had a length of 163 feet (49.7 m) overall, a beam of 20 feet 6 inches (6.2 m) and a mean draught of 10 feet 5 inches (3.2 m). They displaced 483 long tons (491 t) on the surface and 595 long tons (605 t) submerged. The D-class submarines had a crew of 25 officers and ratings and were the first to adopt saddle tanks.

For surface running, the boats were powered by two 600-brake-horsepower (447 kW) diesels, each driving one propeller shaft. When submerged each propeller was driven by a 275-horsepower (205 kW) electric motor. They could reach 14 knots (26 km/h; 16 mph) on the surface and 9 knots (17 km/h; 10 mph) underwater. On the surface, the D class had a range of 2,500 nautical miles (4,600 km; 2,900 mi) at 10 knots (19 km/h; 12 mph).

The boats were armed with three 18-inch (45 cm) torpedo tubes, two in the bow and one in the stern. They carried one reload for each tube, a total of six torpedoes.

== Construction and career ==
D1 was laid down by Vickers on 14 May 1907 and was launched on 16 May 1908 at Barrow. She was commissioned in September 1909. In 1910, D1 took part in the annual manoevures, during which she "torpedoed" two "Blue Fleet" cruisers off Colonsay. This showed that the D class could operate a considerable distance from their base at Fort Blockhouse.

D1 was sunk as a target on 23 October 1918 near Dartmouth.

== Wreck discovery ==
The wreck was discovered by divers looking for the remains of German U-Boats and has been afforded protected status.
