= Heligoland Bight =

Bay in the North Sea

Coordinates: 54.05°N 8.15°E

The location of the Heligoland Bight

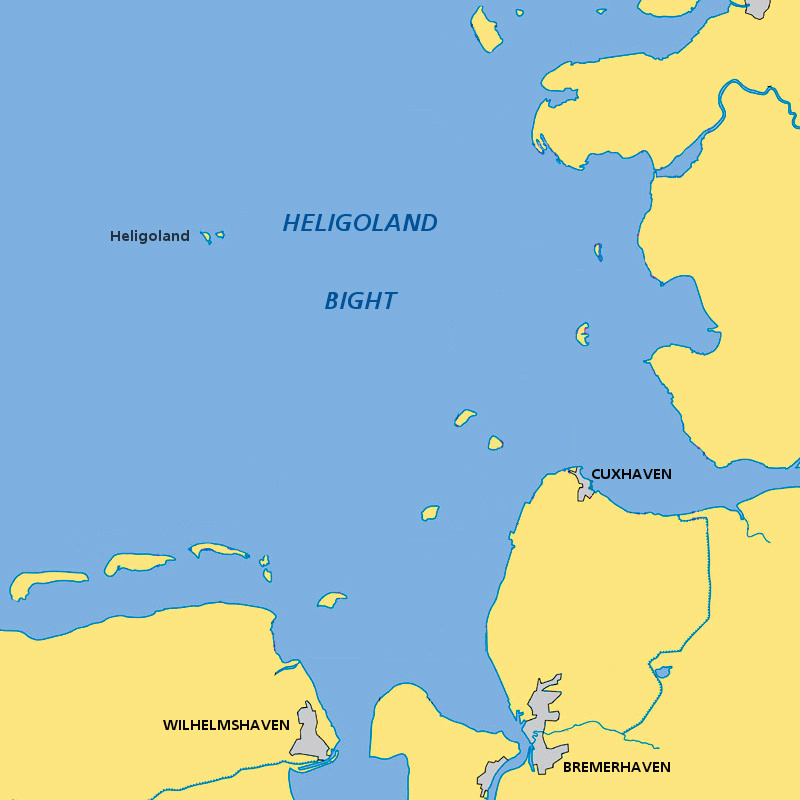
The Heligoland Bight

The Heligoland Bight, also known as Helgoland Bight, (German: Helgoländer Bucht, pronounced [ˈhɛlɡoˌlɛndɐ ˈbʊxt]) is a bay which forms the southern part of the German Bight, itself a bay of the North Sea, located at the mouth of the Elbe river. The Heligoland Bight extends from the mouth of the Elbe to the islands of Heligoland and lies between the East Frisian island of Wangerooge and the North Frisian peninsula of Eiderstedt.

The bight takes its name from the island of Heligoland. It was the location of World War I naval battles in 1914 and 1917. In 1939 it also had a World War II aerial battle named after it.

In the Heligoland Basin (Helgoländer Becken), a basin lying directly southwest of Heligoland, the bight is up to 56 metres (184 ft) deep.

One of the busiest shipping lanes in the world, from Hamburg and the mouth of the Elbe to the Straits of Dover and the English Channel, runs through the Heligoland Bight. The area also includes nature reserves such as the Heligoland Felssockel and the protected Wadden Sea, in which the Wadden Sea National Parks of Schleswig-Holstein (East), Hamburg (southeast) and Lower Saxony (south) are located.

Besides the aforementioned islands of Heligoland, which form the northwestern boundary of the Heligoland Bight, there is the small island of Neuwerk in the southeast, which is located in the Wadden Sea off the Elbe estuary. South of this island is the estuary of the Weser and, to its west, the Jade Bight. Southwest of the Heligoland Bight is the East Frisian island of Wangerooge. East of the bight the Eider enters the sea with, to its north the Eiderstedt Peninsula and, to its south, Meldorf Bay.
