= Battle of Moon Sound =

1917 naval battle in the Baltic Sea

- Part of Eastern Front (World War I)
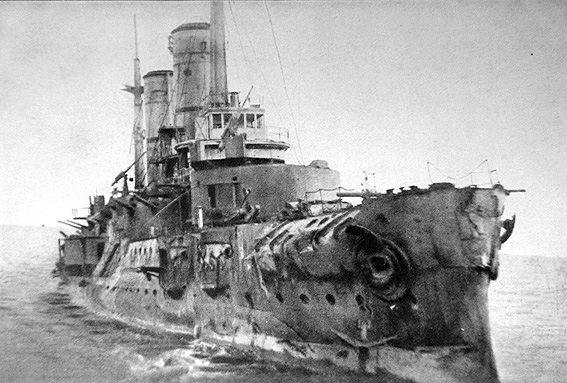
- The Russian pre-dreadnought Slava crippled by German fire off Saaremaa, 17 October 1917.
Date	16 October – 3 November 1917
Location	West Estonian Archipelago and Gulf of Riga, Baltic Sea 58°36′4.85″N 23°26′59.92″E
Result	German victory

Belligerents
German Empire	Russian Republic; United Kingdom

Commanders and leaders
(German Empire) Ehrhard Schmidt	(Russian Empire) Mikhail Bakhirev

Strength
10 battleships 1 battlecruiser 9 light cruisers 1 mine cruiser 50 destroyers 6 submarines	2 pre-dreadnought battleships 3 cruisers 3 gunboats 21 destroyers (United Kingdom) : 3 submarines

Casualties and losses
156 killed 60 wounded 2 dreadnoughts damaged 1 torpedo boat sunk 7 minesweepers sunk various other ships damaged	Unknown number of casualties 1 pre-dreadnought heavily damaged and scuttled 1 destroyer sunk 1 submarine sunk minor damages

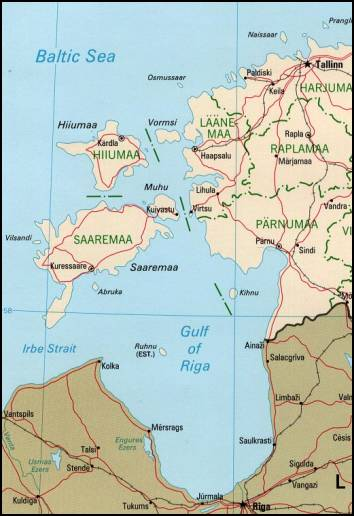
The area of the battle

The Battle of Moon Sound was a naval battle fought between the forces of the German Empire, and the Russian Republic (and three British submarines) in the Baltic Sea during Operation Albion from 16 October 1917 until 3 November 1917 during World War I. The German intention was to destroy the Russian forces and occupy the West Estonian Archipelago, and achieved both objectives. The Imperial German Navy had ten battleships, one battlecruiser, nine light cruisers, one mine cruiser, fifty destroyers and six submarines while the Russians had only two pre-dreadnoughts, three cruisers, three gunboats, twenty-one destroyers, and three British submarines.

== Background ==
It was the Germans' intention to destroy the Russian Army and occupy the West Estonian Archipelago (Moonsund Archipelago). The Germans captured the archipelago, with its main islands of Saaremaa (Ösel), Hiiumaa (Dagö), and Muhu (Moon) during Operation Albion in September 1917. This left a Russian squadron consisting of the old Russo-Japanese War-era pre-dreadnought battleships Grazhdanin (formally Tsesarevich), and Slava, together with cruisers and destroyers, stranded in the Gulf of Riga. Following the battle, the squadron escaped on 17 October 1917 by way of the Suur Strait separating the island of Muhu from the Estonian mainland. It was thought in the West at the time that the Russian naval force could have been stronger if newer and larger ships had been sent from Petrograd and that indiscipline in the navy had prevented this. This was reported in the London newspaper The Times soon afterwards.

Many of the sailors fighting for Russia organised themselves democratically and in the preceding months, these organisations had passed numerous motions denouncing the war and calling for an immediate peace. Nevertheless, they also did not want Petrograd, as the centre of the revolution, to fall into the hands of the German military. Many suspected that sections of the government, which would soon be overthrown in the October Revolution, now wanted to abandon Petrograd so the revolution could be pacified. This train of thought can be seen in the radio message that many of the Russian ships broadcast during the battle; "Attacked by superior German forces our fleet will go down in unequal battle. Not one of our ships will decline the fight. The slandered and maligned fleet will do its duty...but not at the command of a miserable Russian Bonaparte, ruling by the long-suffering patience of the revolution...not in the name of the treaties of our rulers with the Allies, binding in chains the hands of Russian freedom...In the hour when the waves of the Baltic are stained with the blood of our brothers...we raise our voice:...Oppressed people of the whole world! Lift the banner of revolt!"

== Battle ==
At the start of the Battle of Moon Sound, there were two British submarines in the Gulf of Riga. They were C 27 (Lt. Sealy) and C 32 (Lt. Satow). When the Germans got there, Captain Francis Cromie sent out another submarine, C 26 (Lt. Downie). On the night of 16 October, Lt. Sealy fired two torpedoes at two German ships but missed. Two further torpedoes struck their targets. C 27 returned to Hanko when it was no longer needed. C 32 attempted to attack a German ship but was spotted and bombed. In the afternoon of 16 October, Gruppe Behncke travelled to the south exit of the Suur Strait and dropped anchor around 8:30 pm. All German ships were anchored in a close line with a torpedo boat at each end. The Germans made significant progress onshore on 16 October, taking 120 officers and 400 men prisoner and capturing 49 guns. By the end of the day, German forces were prepared to capture the West Estonian Archipelago and the navy was ready to attack in the Matsalu Bay and the Suur Strait.

The Russian battle strategy was changed at 4:30 am on 17 October due to a mistake made in the transfer of an order. That morning, ships were on the move by 7:00. The 3rd M.S.H.F was heading east while the 8th H.f.F.l. was heading north under the command of Erich Koellner.

At 7:20 am, Russian battleships opened fire on the 8th H.f.F.l, the 3rd M.S. Dive and the Sperrbrecher. The 8th advanced but were under constant Russian fire. It was the 3rd M.S.H.F's duty to clear mines.

At 8:00 am, Admiral Behncke ordered that the cruisers not advance any further. At this point, the dreadnoughts König and Kronprinz proceeded east by the 3rd M.S.H.F, both under the command of Georg von der Marwitz. Slava was advancing so that she came between Paternoster and Werder and started firing upon any east-bound German ship. While this was going on, the 3rd M.S.H.F. had reached Laura Bank and turned north, König and Kronprinz continued east and Slava was now heading north. Admiral Hopman was at the same time heading west towards the Väike Strait.

At 9:10 am, two Russian ships that had returned south opened fire on the 3rd M.S.H.F. The Russians now understood that if they could stop the minesweepers, they could stop the entire German attack. At 9:40 am, 3rd Ms. Dive was brought over to the east side of Russian minefields to assist the 3rd H.f.F.l.

By 10:00 am, the minesweepers were on the northern edge of the rectangular minefield. König and Kronprinz now went forward. Around 10:13 am, König opened fire on Slava. By 10:17 am, Kronprinz followed König's lead and opened fire on the battleship Grazhdanin. The armored cruiser Bayan was also attacked by König. Slava took many underwater hits, causing extensive damage. Grazhdanin only got hit twice in all of the chaos. At 10:40 am, the Germans ceased fire. The Russians continued to fire on the 3rd M.S.H.F. Around 10:30 am, Admiral Bachirev ordered all sea forces to withdraw to the northern Suur Strait. Slava, now damaged beyond repair, was scuttled by Turkmerec Strauropolski. The Russians were determined to make the channel impossible to pass through so they laid out more mines and used damaged ships to their advantage. At 10:46 am, the Werder Battery opened fire on the German battleships.

At approximately 11:09 am, two German battleships anchored while under fire at Võilaid. At 11:28 am, there was a false submarine alarm followed by a legitimate one at 12:08 pm.

Around 1:35 pm, the light cruiser Kolberg attacked Võilaid for approximately ten minutes but met no reply. At 3:45 pm, Admiral Hopman's flagleutnant Obltz Keln led a landing party to take over Woi. At 5:30 pm, a white star shell could be seen which meant that the battery had successfully been taken but the guns were unserviceable. By 3:00 pm, Kommodore Heinrich took V100 toward the channel that would lead them to the Suur Strait but was immediately under fire from gunboats under the control of Admiral Makarov.

At 10:00 pm, Kptlt Zander began to go forward to the Suur Strait. The V25-class torpedo boat S 50 took up position to mark the passage. At the end of the day, Germans were in control over the southern Suur Strait, the Väike Strait and the Matsalu Bay. On the night of 17 October, the Russians gave up trying to capture the Suur Strait. Just after midnight on 18 October, V25-class torpedo boat S 64 hit a mine and was rendered unmanoeuvrable. She sank before 1:00 am. At dawn, German torpedo boats assumed patrol stations in the Matsalu Bay. The landing operations on Hiiumaa gained momentum between 7:15 and 8:00 am, and the area around Emmaste was secured. By 8:30 am, German minesweepers had worked forward to a mile south of the Viirelaid lighthouse. At 8:00 am, Behncke's group started east and went behind the 3rd M.S.H.F.

Just after 10:00 am, Behncke ordered Admiral Hopman to dispatch the light cruiser Strassburg and the 8th M.S.H.F. to the 3rd Squadron while Kolberg, the torpedo-boats and Sperrbrecher would remain to the west. At 12:40 pm, the 3rd M.S.H.F. and two boats of the half flotilla confirmed that Slava was sunk along with two freight steamers. The Germans could see Russian destroyers laying mines, the Russians had not yet detected the Germans, so the Germans opened fire, which was met with a reply. Two German torpedo boats opened fire as the Germans continued northward, two Russian gunboats and several destroyers took them under fire. They then turned south at high speed under the cover of a smokescreen. By the evening of the 18th, Kuressaare had been made a supply base, the southern part of Hiiumaa under control of the Second Cyclist Battalion and the S-Flotilla landing section, Saaremaa and Muhu were now firmly in German hands.

On 19 October, the forces of the Gulf of Riga and numerous transport steamers and auxiliaries left the northern Suur Strait under the protection of minesweepers and destroyers. By mid-afternoon, the German forces had penetrated the strait. The German losses were seven minesweepers, nine trawlers and small boats as well as one torpedo boat. The army had 54 dead and 141 wounded. The German Army captured 20,130 prisoners and 141 Russian guns including 47 heavy pieces and 130 machine guns.

== Aftermath ==
According to Leon Trotsky, the loss of the Moon Sound archipelago was used by the provisional government as a pretext to begin preparations to move the capital from Petrograd to Moscow. The Bolsheviks accused the provisional government of refusing to defend the revolutionary capital and attempting to abandon it to Imperialist forces. Pressure from below forced the government to abandon these plans.

The Russian losses were minor, the destroyer Grom was sunk and Slava scuttled as a blockship at the archipelago entrance, with most of the crews rescued. Other ships were damaged, but none severely. On 19 October, the rest of the Russian fleet was able to escape the archipelago to Lapvik, Finland, after bad weather and minefields prevented the German fleet from intercepting it.

The Germans suffered more casualties, 156 were killed and another 60 were wounded. They lost more craft, though mostly small torpedo boats, S 64 hit a mine and sank. Additionally, before the operation, 2 ships were sunk and 2 damaged by mines, while during the operation, multiple ships were sunk by mines, the battleships Bayern and Grosser Kurfürst were both damaged by mines and Kronprinz ran aground while returning to Kiel, which took months to repair, the transport Corsica was damaged by a mine and ran aground, the minesweeper tender Indianola was damaged by a torpedo from a British submarine, and seven minesweepers were sunk in anti-mine operations.

Operation Albion was a tremendous German success, with the Russian forces on the islands destroyed, and the islands and coastal batteries firmly in German hands. The Russian defeat prompted the Russian military to refuse further operations and on the 7th of November, the Bolsheviks overthrew the provisional government.

== See also ==
- Operation Albion
- Moonsund Landing Operation (1944)

== Sources ==
- Barrett, Michael B (2007). Operation Albion: the German conquest of the Baltic Islands. Indiana University Press. ISBN 978-0-253-34969-9.
- Halpern, Paul (1994). A Naval History of World War I. UCL Press. ISBN 1-85728-295-7.
