= HMS E8 =

Submarine of the Royal Navy

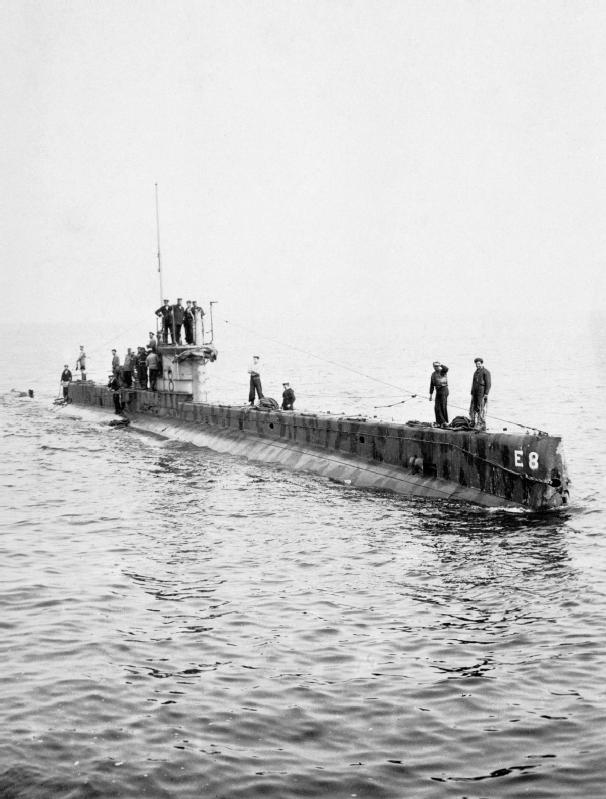
- E8, returning from a patrol, summer 1916

History

United Kingdom
- Name: E8
- Builder: HM Dockyard, Chatham
- Cost: £105,700
- Laid down: 30 March 1912
- Launched: 30 October 1913
- Commissioned: 18 June 1914
- Fate: Scuttled, 4 April 1918

General characteristics
- Class & type: E-class submarine
- Displacement: 652 long tons (662 t) surfaced; 795 long tons (808 t) submerged
- Length: 178 ft (54 m)
- Beam: 15 ft 5 in (4.70 m)
- Propulsion: 2 × 800 hp (597 kW) diesel; 2 × 420 hp (313 kW) electric; 2 screws
- Speed: 15 knots (28 km/h; 17 mph) surfaced; 9.5 knots (17.6 km/h; 10.9 mph) submerged
- Range: 3,000 nmi (5,600 km) at 10 kn (19 km/h; 12 mph); 65 nmi (120 km) at 5 kn (9.3 km/h; 5.8 mph)
- Complement: 31
- Armament: 4 × 18 inch (450 mm) torpedo tubes (1 bow, 2 beam, 1 stern)

HMS E8 was a British E-class submarine built at Chatham Dockyard. She was laid down on 30 March 1912 and was commissioned on 18 June 1914. She cost £105,700. During World War I, she was part of the British submarine flotilla in the Baltic.

== Design ==
The early British E-class submarines, from E1 to E8, had a displacement of 652 long tons (662 t) at the surface and 795 long tons (808 t) while submerged. They had a length overall of 180 feet (55 m) and a beam of 22 feet 8.5 inches (6.922 m), and were powered by two 800 horsepower (600 kW) Vickers eight-cylinder two-stroke diesel engines and two 420 horsepower (310 kW) electric motors. The class had a maximum surface speed of 16 knots (30 km/h; 18 mph) and a submerged speed of 10 knots (19 km/h; 12 mph), with a fuel capacity of 50 long tons (51 t) of diesel affording a range of 3,225 miles (5,190 km; 2,802 nmi) when travelling at 10 knots (19 km/h; 12 mph), while submerged they had a range of 85 miles (137 km; 74 nmi) at 5 knots (9.3 km/h; 5.8 mph).

The 'Group 1' E class boats were armed with four 18 inch (450 mm) torpedo tubes, one in the bow, one either side amidships, and one in the stern; a total of eight torpedoes were carried. Group 1 boats were not fitted with a deck gun during construction, but those involved in the Dardanelles campaign had guns mounted forward of the conning tower while at Malta Dockyard.

E-Class submarines had wireless systems with 1 kilowatt (1.3 hp) power ratings; in some submarines, these were later upgraded to 3 kilowatts (4.0 hp) systems by removing a midship torpedo tube. Their maximum design depth was 100 feet (30 m) although in service some reached depths of below 200 feet (61 m).

== Crew ==
E8′s complement was three officers and 28 men.

== Service history ==
When war was declared with Germany on 5 August 1914, E8 was based at Harwich, in the 8th Submarine Flotilla of the Home Fleets.

On that morning the destroyers HMS Ariel and HMS Amethyst towed E8 and HMS E6, respectively to Terschelling. E8 and E6 then made the first Heligoland Bight patrol of World War I.

On 23 October 1915, E8 sank the 9,050-ton, three-funnel German armoured cruiser SMS Prinz Adalbert in the Baltic Sea 20 nautical miles (37 km) west of Libau. As the result of this action the submarine's commander, Commander Francis Goodhart, received the Cross of St. George from Tsar Nicholas II. During her time in the Baltic, Aksel Berg, who later became a key figure in Soviet cybernetics, was her liaison officer.

== Fate ==
E8 met her fate on 4 April 1918 outside Helsingfors (Helsinki) 1.5 nautical miles (2.8 km) off Harmaja Light in the Gulf of Finland. She was scuttled by her crew, along with E1, E9, E19, C26, C27, and C35 to avoid seizure by advancing German forces who had landed nearby.

E8 was salvaged in August 1953 for breaking up in Finland.
