= HMS E19 =

British submarine in service during WWI

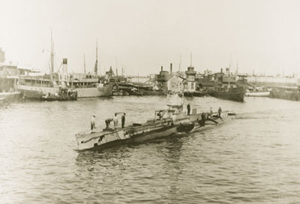
- At Reval (Tallinn) during World War I

History

United Kingdom
- Name: E19
- Laid down: 27 November 1914
- Launched: 13 May 1915
- Commissioned: 12 July 1915
- Fate: Scuttled 8 April 1918 at Helsinki to avoid capture

General characteristics
- Class & type: E-class submarine
- Displacement: 662 tons (surfaced); 807 tons (submerged)
- Length: 54.86 m
- Beam: 6.86 m
- Draught: 3.81 m
- Propulsion: Twin-shaft, 2 × 800 bhp Vickers diesel, 2 × 420 shp electric motors
- Speed: 15.25 knots (surfaced); 9.75 knots (submerged)
- Range: 325 nm surfaced
- Endurance: 24 days
- Complement: 3 officers, 28 ratings
- Armament: 2 × 18 inch (450 mm) bow tube; 2 × 18" beam tubes; 1 × 18" stern tube; (10 torpedoes); 1 × 2 pdr deck gun

HMS E19 was an E-class submarine of the Royal Navy, commissioned in 1914 at Vickers, Barrow-in-Furness. During World War I she was part of the British submarine flotilla in the Baltic.

== Design ==
Like all post-E8 British E-class submarines, E19 had a displacement of 662 long tons (673 t) at the surface and 807 long tons (820 t) while submerged. She had a total length of 180 feet (55 m) and a beam of 22 feet 8.5 inches (6.922 m). She was powered by two 800 horsepower (600 kW) Vickers eight-cylinder two-stroke diesel engines and two 420 horsepower (310 kW) electric motors. The submarine had a maximum surface speed of 16 knots (30 km/h; 18 mph) and a submerged speed of 10 knots (19 km/h; 12 mph). British E-class submarines had fuel capacities of 50 long tons (51 t) of diesel and ranges of 3,255 miles (5,238 km; 2,829 nmi) when travelling at 10 knots (19 km/h; 12 mph). E19 was capable of operating submerged for five hours when travelling at 5 knots (9.3 km/h; 5.8 mph).

E19 was probably the first of the E-class to be fitted with a deck gun during construction, in this instance, possibly uniquely, with only a 2-pounder, forward of the conning tower. She had five 18 inch (450 mm) torpedo tubes, two in the bow, one either side amidships, and one in the stern; a total of 10 torpedoes were carried.

E-Class submarines had wireless systems with 1 kilowatt (1.3 hp) power ratings; in some submarines, these were later upgraded to 3 kilowatts (4.0 hp) systems by removing a midship torpedo tube. Their maximum design depth was 100 feet (30 m) although in service some reached depths of below 200 feet (61 m). Some submarines contained Fessenden oscillator systems.

== Crew ==
Her complement was three officers and 28 men.

== Service history ==
Under the command of Lieutenant Commander Francis Cromie, E19 was, in September 1915, the last of five British submarines to manage the passage through the Oresund into the Baltic Sea. She was then able to sink several German ships, most notably on 11 October 1915 when she sank four German freighters just south of Öland within a few hours and without any casualties. On 7 November 1915 E19 sank the German light cruiser SMS Undine.

E19 was scuttled by her crew outside Helsinki 1.5 nm south of Harmaja Light, Gulf of Finland, along with E1, E8, E9, C26, C27, and C35 to avoid seizure by advancing German forces who had landed nearby.

== Trivia ==
A beer, Slottskällans Vrak, has been brewed using yeast recovered from beer bottles found on the wreck of SS Nicomedia, a ship sunk by E19 off Öland.
