= HMS E18 =

Submarine of the Royal Navy

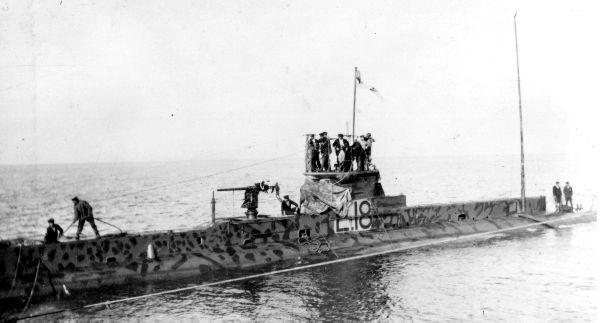
- E18 shortly after passing through the Øresund in September 1915. Note the camouflage paintwork to prevent detection by shore observers

History

United Kingdom
- Name: E18
- Builder: Vickers
- Laid down: 1 January 1914
- Launched: 4 March 1915
- Commissioned: 6 June 1915
- Fate: Lost with all hands, late May 1916

General characteristics
- Class & type: E-class submarine
- Displacement: 662 tons (surfaced; 807 tons (submerged)
- Length: 54.86 m
- Beam: 6.86 m
- Draught: 3.81 m
- Propulsion: Twin propellers, 2 × 800 bhp (600 kW) Vickers diesel, 2 × 420 shp (313 kW) electric motors
- Speed: 15.25 knots (surfaced); 9.75 knots (submerged)
- Range: 325 nm surfaced
- Endurance: 24 days
- Complement: 3 officers, 28 ratings
- Armament: 2 × 18 inch bow tube; 2 × 18 inch beam tubes; 1 × 18 inch stern tube; (10 torpedoes); 1 × 12 pdr deck gun

HMS E18 was an E-class submarine of the Royal Navy, launched in 1915 and lost in the Baltic Sea in May 1916 while operating out of Reval. The exact circumstances surrounding the sinking remain a mystery. The wreck of the submarine was discovered in October 2009.

== Design ==
Like all post-E8 British E-class submarines, E18 had a displacement of 662 long tons (673 t) at the surface and 807 long tons (820 t) while submerged. She had a total length of 180 feet (55 m) and a beam of 22 feet 8.5 inches (6.922 m). She was powered by two 800 horsepower (600 kW) Vickers eight-cylinder two-stroke diesel engines and two 420 horsepower (310 kW) electric motors. The submarine had a maximum surface speed of 16 knots (30 km/h; 18 mph) and a submerged speed of 10 knots (19 km/h; 12 mph). British E-class submarines had fuel capacities of 50 long tons (51 t) of diesel and ranges of 3,255 miles (5,238 km; 2,829 nmi) when travelling at 10 knots (19 km/h; 12 mph). E18 was capable of operating submerged for five hours when travelling at 5 knots (9.3 km/h; 5.8 mph).

As with most of the early E class boats, E18 was not fitted with a deck gun during construction but later had a 12-pounder 76 mm (3.0 in) QF gun mounted forward of the conning tower. She had five 18 inch (450 mm) torpedo tubes, two in the bow, one either side amidships, and one in the stern; a total of 10 torpedoes were carried.

E-Class submarines had wireless systems with 1 kilowatt (1.3 hp) power ratings; in some submarines, these were later upgraded to 3 kilowatts (4.0 hp) systems by removing a midship torpedo tube. Their maximum design depth was 100 feet (30 m) although in service some reached depths of below 200 feet (61 m). Some submarines contained Fessenden oscillator systems.

== Crew ==
Her complement was three officers and 28 men.

== Service history ==
=== 1915 ===
E18 entered service in the UK in 1915, commanded by Lieutenant-Commander R.C. Halahan. She joined HMS Maidstone on 25 June 1915 and soon began North Sea patrols with the 8th Flotilla at Harwich. On her one and only patrol prior to leaving for the Baltic E18 departed Yarmouth with D7 and E13 on 9 July 1915. On 14 July 1915 when at the mouth of the Ems deep in enemy waters Halahan brought E18 to the surface as he preferred the sea to using the toilet arrangements on board. While in this awkward situation a Zeppelin appeared, E18 dived to the sea bed but was easily visible from the air. E18 was then straddled with 12 bombs which caused no damage other than some embarrassment to Halahan in being caught unawares. The fact E18 was surfaced wasn't passed on via Halahan's patrol report, he stated he was submerged at 20 ft, and an inquiry into submarine visibility from the air led E18 being painted in her camouflage scheme. Strangely there is no German claim of an attack on a submarine - the Zeppelins in the air that day in this area were, L4, L6 and L7, none of which sighted a submarine let alone attacked one. L6 was the closest to E18's position when a Zeppelin was sighted but she moved away to the west when the explosions occurred. German minesweeping divisions were exploding mines during the time of the alleged attack which could explain what the crew of E18 heard while submerged.

E18 was dispatched to the Baltic as part of the British submarine flotilla in the Baltic. She left Harwich on 28 August with her sister-ship HMS E19, first travelling to Newcastle to swing their compasses during which E19 burnt out one of her main armatures. After the delay to repair E19 they left Newcastle for the Baltic on 4 September at 1630 hrs. The two submarines separated and passed through the Øresund between Denmark and Sweden on the night of 8–9 September. During the passage E19 at one stage found herself only metres from E18's stern and decided not to enter together. E18 encountered two German destroyers. She dived into water only 23 feet (7 m) deep and — for almost three hours — progressed by crashing into the seabed and rising back up to break the surface. After several hours resting in deep water she surfaced in the morning only to be fired on by the German cruiser Amazone; once again she dived to the bottom. The German cruiser and attending destroyers then began to criss-cross over E18 knowing her batteries would be very low. E18 had to remain on the bottom until the German ships, not then equipped with depth charges, left the area. After escaping she was attacked by another two destroyers, one of which came close to ramming her. On 10 September 1915 Halahan sighted what he thought were the German battlecruisers Lutzow and Seydlitz, and tried in vain to get into an attacking position, but in fact the ships were two German destroyers, the battlecruisers not in the area at the time. On 12 September E18 joined E19 and E9 off Dagerort, arriving in Reval (now Tallinn, Estonia) on the 13th. Halahan later wrote that entering the Baltic again should not be attempted unless absolutely necessary.

E18 operated out of Reval through the autumn of 1915, departing on her first Baltic patrol on 21 September 1915. The following day she was in an excellent position to torpedo the German cruiser Bremen, but a surfaced Russian submarine caused the Bremen to turn away just as E18 was about to fire and the opportunity was lost; she returned to Reval on 29 September.

On 9 October 1915 E18 departed for her second patrol, by 12 October she was in position to attack the pre-dreadnought SMS Braunschweig whilst off Libau (now Liepāja, Latvia), but her torpedo tube bow caps could not be opened. She then tried her beam tube but was forced to dive by German destroyers. When she did manage to fire a torpedo from her stern tube, the range was too great. She returned to Reval on 16 October.

E18 departed Reval on 9 November 1915 to patrol the Swedish trade routes, returning on 15 November having sighted nothing of significance. During this patrol the crew had missed the visit of the Tzar.

Her fourth and final patrol of 1915 was off Libau and try to find a way through the minefields by following the courses of German traffic. She departed for this patrol on 30 November and returned on 4 December.

=== 1916 ===
E18 left for her fifth patrol on 6 January 1916, her orders were to patrol the area between the Sound and Bornholm. Attempts were made to recall her, as the patrol had been cancelled but she did not reply. On returning, she encountered gale-force winds and icy conditions to the point where she had difficulty closing her conning tower hatch owing to ice. She was unable to return to Reval on her own and had to wait for the Finnish ice breaker Sampo to arrive and guide her in, completely iced over. The British submarines remained iced-in and could not move until April. Although she did not sail, E18 was made ready for sea by 13 February, and was the first of the British submarines to sail on 29 March after the freeze.

E18 resumed patrols on 28 April, her penultimate patrol to the Gulf of Riga with HMS E1, to show their presence to the Germans, this was achieved by diving twice while Russian destroyers shelled beaches. While returning to Reval via Moon Sound on 1 May, E18 ran aground and had to be towed off.

On May 25 E18 sailed on her final patrol; E1, E8, and two Russian submarines left the same day. Records differ on her exact fate, but it is certain neither she nor any of her crew survived.

The diary of Francis Goodhart, commander of E8, states that E1 and the Russian Bars departed at 1400 hrs, E8, E18 and the Russian Gerpard left port together at 1800 hrs on 25 May; E8's patrol was uneventful, and she returned to Reval on the 31st. However, E18 failed to return; by 5 June Goodhart noted that the crews were "very worried". On the 6th, he noted that he had "Heard from Essen that their W.T. had vaguely indicated presence of a submarine off Redshoff" (Note: There does not appear to be a place called "Redshoff"; it may be a mishearing of Kurisches Haff, a German term for the Curonian Lagoon south of Memel/Klaipėda) on Tuesday (Note: i.e. 30 May 1916). Very slender hope..." By the next day, 8 June, he recorded that a meeting had noted she had sailed with only 15 days food; the situation was "very hopeless now, I fear. No news whatsoever" By the 9 June E8's officers began collecting the belongings of E18's Halahan, Landale and Colson from their cabins.

Michael Wilson, a historian, records that E8 and E18 sailed on the 25th and parted the next day. On the 26th, at 4:42 PM, E18 torpedoed the German destroyer V100, blowing off her bow. Had it not been for the calm seas, it is likely she would have sunk from the damage; as it was, she was towed back to port with several of her crew killed, requiring major repairs. Two days later, on the 28th, E18 was sighted by a German aircraft off Memel (now Klaipėda, Lithuania), E18 was last sighted on the 1 June 1916 at 1500 hrs sailing north by the German U-boat UB-30 northwest of Steinort. Wilson further states that it is believed she was lost "most likely by striking a mine" on her return to Reval west of Osel. The logs of the German destroyers with V100 also support the same dates as Goodhart's diary and Wilson's observations.

Various sources record her simply as having been sunk on 24 May by a German decoy ship, (Note: For example, a footnote by the editor of Goodhart's diary, which gives her as "sunk off Bornholm". The German ship is sometimes named as KE41; naval-history.net refers simply to "decoy ship K".) though this clashes with the known attack on V100 on the 26th and the observations reported by Wilson and Goodhart in subsequent days. It is quite possible that this is a garbling of an encounter between one of the Russian submarines and a decoy vessel around the same time. The German decoy ship Kronprinz Wilhelm (known as Schiff K (Note: See SMS Schiff K at German Wikipedia)) did attack two submarines during E18's patrol in May. K rammed the Russian Gerpard and the following day took the Russian Bars under fire in Hano Bay. The Germans believed they had sunk both submarines; E18 was not in the area of these actions.

Tsar Nicholas II sent a telegram of condolence on the loss of E18, and posthumously decorated the crew; Halahan awarded the Order of St. George, the other two officers the Order of St. Vladimir. These Orders were not normally awarded posthumously. Three of E18's crew did not sail on her last mission; one, Jeremiah Ryan had measles and later transferred to E19; another, Albert Phillips, missed her patrol for unknown reasons. The third was signalman Albert Edward Robinson who was replaced on this mission by E8's telegraphist George Gaby; he was later sent home in January 1917 and joined E4 on her recommissioning. Ryan and Phillips went home in January 1918.

NB: 11 June 1916 is stated on the crew's papers as the date of being 'lost at sea', purely for administration purposes to close the books on E18, as the timing and circumstances of E18's loss were unknown.

=== Discovery of the wreck, 2009 ===
In October 2009, the wreck of HMS E18 was discovered by a ROV deployed by the Swedish survey vessel MV Triad. The position of the wreck lies off the coast of Hiiumaa, Estonia. Photographs taken of the wreck show the submarine with its hatch open, suggesting that it struck a mine while sailing on the surface.
