= British submarine flotilla in the Baltic =

British naval unit in service during WWI

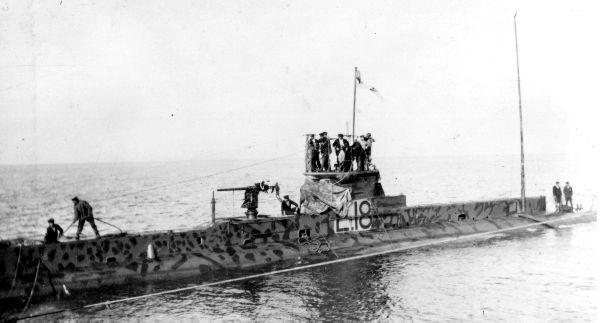
HMS E18 after passing through the Oresund in September 1915

A British submarine flotilla operated in the Baltic Sea for three years during the First World War. The squadron of nine submarines was attached to the Russian Baltic Fleet. The main task of the flotilla was to prevent the import of iron ore from Sweden to Imperial Germany. The success of the flotilla also forced the German Navy in the Baltic to keep to their bases and denied the German High Seas Fleet a training ground. The flotilla was based in Reval (Tallinn), and for most of its career commanded by Captain Francis Cromie.

The flotilla originally consisted of six E-class and five C-class submarines. The smaller C-class submarines reached the Baltic Sea from the White Sea via northern rivers; the long-range E-class submarines managed to enter the German backwaters by passing undetected through the narrow and shallow Danish Straits. Two submarines were lost to stranding and one went missing, now presumed sunk by a mine.

In 1918, the German occupation of Tallinn and the Brest-Litovsk peace treaty forced the flotilla to move to Helsinki, under the protection of the Finnish Socialist Workers' Republic. The German intervention in the Finnish Civil War and the landing of the 10,000-strong German Baltic Sea Division in Hanko forced the crew to scuttle the eight remaining submarines and the three support ships, Cicero, Emilie and Obsidian, outside Helsinki harbour.

A similar fate awaited the flotilla's Russian counterpart. The Ice Cruise of the Baltic Fleet had left four Russian Holland type submarines without support in Hanko. The arrival of German troops under Rüdiger von der Goltz on 3 April forced the Russians to hastily scuttle the submarines—including AG 12 and AG 16—in Hanko harbour.

== Submarines ==
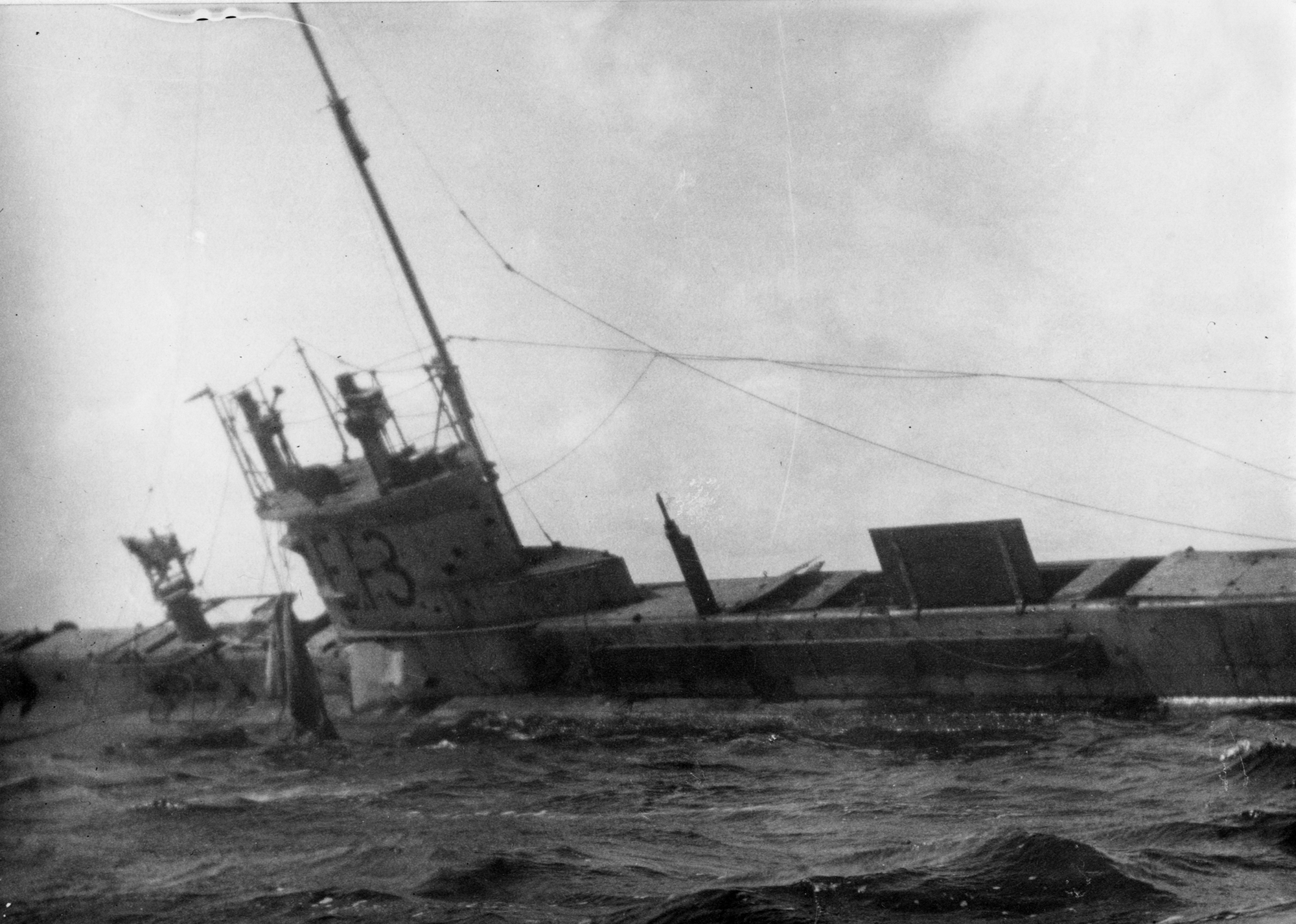
The British submarine HMS E13 aground at Saltholm in The Sound in 1915 before being attacked by German torpedo boats

=== E class ===
The E-class submarines entered the Baltic Sea through the Danish Straits through waters only 10 metres (33 ft) deep. On 19 August 1915, HMS E13 was stranded in The Sound near Saltholm. In a breach of Danish neutrality, she was destroyed by German torpedo boat G132, with a loss of 15 of her crew. The other subs managed to enter the Baltic without being intercepted by the Germans. HMS E18 and E19 made the passage to Reval safely in September 1915.

- HMS E9—commanded by Max Horton—intercepted four German steamers on 18–19 October 1915.
- HMS E18 was lost in the Baltic Sea in May 1916 while operating out of Reval. Examination of the wreck, discovered off Hiiumaa, Estonia, in 2009, suggests that it struck a mine while sailing on the surface.
- HMS E19—commanded by Francis Cromie—intercepted four German steamers on 10–11 October 1915. She also sank the German Gazelle-class warship SMS Undine.

The last four E-class submarines—HMS E1, E8, E9, and E19—were scuttled outside Helsinki, south of the Harmaja Light, in 1918 to prevent capture by German troops who had landed nearby.

=== C class ===
Four C-class submarines were sent there in September 1915 by a tortuous route—towed around the North Cape to Arkhangelsk and taken by barge to Kronstadt, by way of the Dvina and Sukhona rivers to Vologda then via Lake Onega and Lake Ladoga to Petrograd. HMS C26, C27, C32 and C35 reached Saint Petersburg on the Gulf of Finland on 9 September 1916, but due to difficulties with the batteries became fully operational only in the 1917 sealing season.

- HMS C32 stranded on a mudbank near Pärnu on the north-eastern side of the Gulf of Riga on 24 October 1917 while trying to prevent Operation Albion, the German operation in October to invade the Estonian islands of Saaremaa, Hiiumaa and Muhu.

Three of these boats—HMS C26, C27, and C35—were also scuttled outside Helsinki in 1918.

== Aftermath ==
The crews of the scuttled submarines were evacuated by Soviet ships to Petrograd and by rail to Murmansk, to join with the Allied intervention forces in North Russia, only weeks before hostilities cut railway lines to Murmansk.

Among the officers were future admirals and commanders of the British Submarine Service, Sir Noel Laurence and Sir Max Horton and Vice Admiral Leslie Ashmore. Admiral Aksel Berg also served as Liaison Officer from the Imperial Russian Navy, before going on to become the Deputy Minister of Defence for the Soviet Union (1953–57).

In 1935, the Anglo-German Naval Agreement (AGNA) concluded between Britain and Germany, allowed Germany to increase the size of its navy to one-third the size of the Royal Navy, which would have had the effect of allowing the Kriegsmarine to dominate the Baltic.

Some Finns raised some parts of the scuttled British submarines before World War II but recognized that they were beyond feasible repair and returned them back into the sea. It is believed that the remains were raised in 1953 by the German company Beckedorf Gebryder and used as scrap metal. Wreck of Cicero is believed to have been located in 1995.

== See also ==
- Swedish iron ore during World War II
- Operation Catherine

== Literature ==
- Bainton, Roy (2002). Honoured by strangers : the life of Captain Francis Cromie CB, DSO, RN, 1882-1918. Shrewsbury: Airlife. ISBN 978-1840371963.
- Wilson, Michael (1985). Baltic assignment : British Submariners in Russia 1914-1919. London: Leo Cooper in association with Secker & Warburg. ISBN 978-0436578014.
