= Prinz Adalbert =

Prinz Adalbert may refer to

- SMS Prinz Adalbert (1865), an ironclad ram originally ordered for the Confederate States Navy
- SMS Prinz Adalbert (1876), a corvette that served in the German overseas colonial empire
- SMS Prinz Adalbert (1901), an armored cruiser sunk by a British submarine in World War I
  - Prinz Adalbert-class cruiser
- SS Prinz Adalbert, a German ocean liner of the Hamburg America Line

== See also ==
- Adalbert
- Prince Adalbert (disambiguation)
- SMS Prinz Adalbert, a list of warships
