= HMS E1 =

Submarine of the Royal Navy

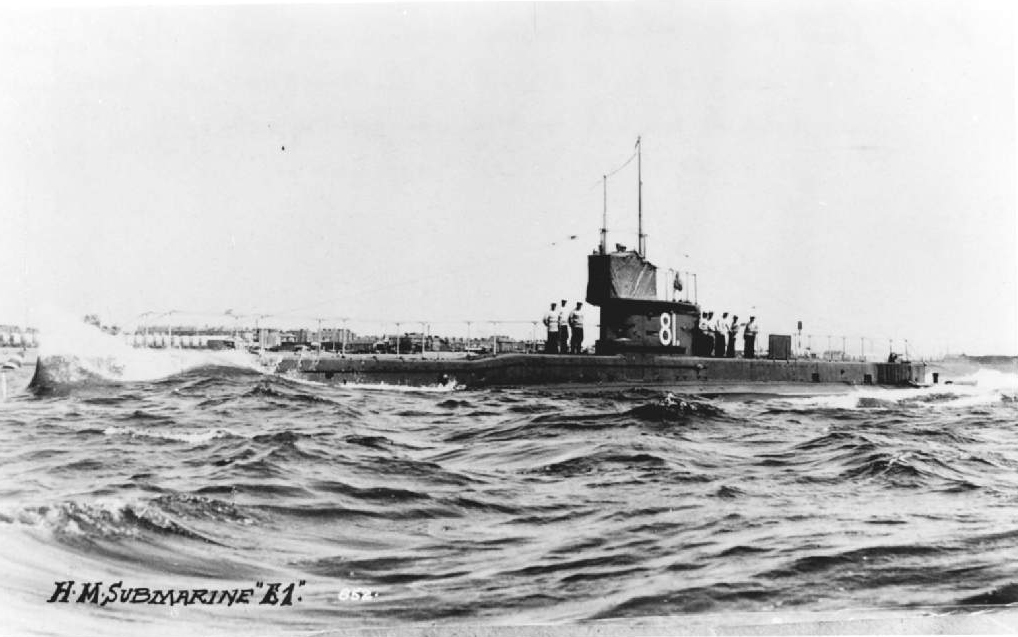

History

United Kingdom
- Name: E1
- Builder: HM Dockyard, Chatham
- Cost: £101,700
- Laid down: 14 February 1911
- Launched: 9 November 1912
- Commissioned: 6 May 1913
- Fate: Scuttled, 3 April 1918

General characteristics
- Class & type: E-class submarine
- Displacement: 652 long tons (662 t) surfaced; 795 long tons (808 t) submerged
- Length: 178 ft (54 m)
- Beam: 15 ft 5 in (4.70 m)
- Propulsion: 2 × 800 hp (597 kW) diesel; 2 × 420 hp (313 kW) electric; 2 propellers
- Speed: 15 knots (28 km/h; 17 mph) surfaced; 9.5 knots (17.6 km/h; 10.9 mph) submerged
- Range: 3,000 nmi (5,600 km) at 10 kn (19 km/h; 12 mph); 65 nmi (120 km) at 5 kn (9.3 km/h; 5.8 mph)
- Complement: 30
- Armament: 4 × 18 inch (450 mm) torpedo tubes (1 bow, 2 beam, 1 stern)

HMS E1 (laid down as HMS D9) was a British E-class submarine that was built by Chatham Dockyard and cost £101,700. E1 was laid down on 14 February 1911. She was launched on 9 November 1912 and was commissioned on 6 May 1913. During World War I she was part of the British submarine flotilla in the Baltic.

== Design ==
The early British E-class submarines, from E1 to E8, had a displacement of 652 long tons (662 t) at the surface and 795 long tons (808 t) while submerged. They had a length overall of 180 feet (55 m) and a beam of 22 feet 8.5 inches (6.922 m), and were powered by two 800 horsepower (600 kW) Vickers eight-cylinder two-stroke diesel engines and two 420 horsepower (310 kW) electric motors. The class had a maximum surface speed of 16 knots (30 km/h; 18 mph) and a submerged speed of 10 knots (19 km/h; 12 mph), with a fuel capacity of 50 long tons (51 t) of diesel affording a range of 3,225 miles (5,190 km; 2,802 nmi) when travelling at 10 knots (19 km/h; 12 mph), while submerged they had a range of 85 miles (137 km; 74 nmi) at 5 knots (9.3 km/h; 5.8 mph). Her complement was three officers and 28 men.

The early 'Group 1' E class boats were armed with four 18 inch (450 mm) torpedo tubes, one in the bow, one either side amidships, and one in the stern; a total of eight torpedoes were carried. Group 1 boats were not fitted with a deck gun during construction, but those involved in the Dardanelles campaign had guns mounted forward of the conning tower while at Malta Dockyard.

E-Class submarines had wireless systems with 1 kilowatt (1.3 hp) power ratings; in some submarines, these were later upgraded to 3 kilowatts (4.0 hp) systems by removing a midship torpedo tube. Their maximum design depth was 100 feet (30 m) although in service some reached depths of below 200 feet (61 m). Some submarines contained Fessenden oscillator systems.

== Service history ==
E1 joined the 8th Submarine Flotilla, based at Portsmouth on commissioning.

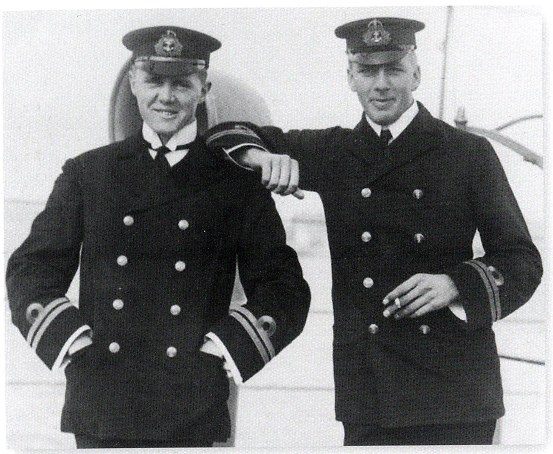
Noel Laurence (right), commander of E1, with Max Horton (left), commander of E9, in the Baltic

She worked with E5 and reconnoitered the Skagerrak in early October as a prelude to sending submarines into the Baltic. Then on 15 October 1914, she and E9 sailed from Gorleston in a successful attempt to penetrate the German defences and enter the Baltic. On 18 October 1914, E1 unsuccessfully attacked the armoured cruiser SMS Victoria Louise in Kiel Bay. The torpedo ran too deep and missed. On 22 July 1915, E1 fired two torpedoes at the German Vorpostenboot (or patrol boat) Neumühlen, which missed. On 30 July 1915, she torpedoed and sank the German auxiliary minesweeper Aachen east-northeast of Östergarn, Gotland, Sweden. On 19 August 1915, she torpedoed and damaged the German battlecruiser Moltke (23,000 tons) during the Battle of the Gulf of Riga.

E1's service ended on 3 April 1918 outside Helsingfors (Helsinki), 1.5 nautical miles (2.8 km) off Harmaja Light in the Gulf of Finland. She was scuttled by her crew, along with E8, E9, E19, C26, C27, and C35 to avoid seizure by advancing German forces which had landed nearby.
