= SMS Amazone =

Light cruiser of the German Imperial Navy

- SMS Amazone

History

German Empire
- Name: Amazone
- Laid down: December 1899
- Launched: 6 October 1900
- Commissioned: 15 November 1901
- Decommissioned: 15 January 1930
- Stricken: 31 March 1931
- Fate: Scrapped, 1954

General characteristics
- Class & type: Gazelle-class cruiser
- Displacement: Normal: 2,659 t (2,617 long tons); Full load: 3,082 t (3,033 long tons)
- Length: 104.8 m (343 ft 10 in) loa
- Beam: 12.2 m (40 ft)
- Draft: 5.12 m (16 ft 10 in)
- Installed power: 10 × water-tube boilers; 8,000 PS (7,900 ihp)
- Propulsion: 2 × triple-expansion steam engines; 2 × screw propellers
- Speed: 21.5 knots (39.8 km/h; 24.7 mph)
- Range: 3,560 nmi (6,590 km; 4,100 mi) at 10 knots (19 km/h; 12 mph)
- Complement: 14 officers; 243 enlisted men
- Armament: 10 × 10.5 cm (4.1 in) SK L/40 guns; 2 × 45 cm (17.7 in) torpedo tubes
- Armor: Deck: 20 to 25 mm (0.79 to 0.98 in); Conning tower 80 mm (3.1 in); Gun shields: 50 mm (2 in)

SMS Amazone was the sixth member of the ten-ship Gazelle class of light cruisers that were built for the German Kaiserliche Marine (Imperial Navy) in the late 1890s and early 1900s. The Gazelle class was the culmination of earlier unprotected cruiser and aviso designs, combining the best aspects of both types in what became the progenitor of all future light cruisers of the Imperial fleet. Built to be able to serve with the main German fleet and as a colonial cruiser, she was armed with a battery of ten 10.5 cm (4.1 in) guns and a top speed of 21.5 knots (39.8 km/h; 24.7 mph).

After commissioning in late 1901, Amazone spent the first four years of her career in the reconnaissance forces of the German fleet. There, she earned a reputation for being the most accident-prone vessel of the fleet, being involved in numerous collisions and other accidents. During this period, she conducted training exercises with the rest of the fleet and made several trips abroad. As more modern cruisers began to enter service in 1905, Amazone was placed in reserve until the start of World War I in 1914. During the war, she operated in the Baltic Sea in the Detached Division, taking part in numerous operations in the central and northern Baltic to support the German Army. By the end of 1914, Amazone was no longer able to keep up with the other cruisers in the Baltic, so she was transferred to the Coastal Defense Division. She saw no action during this period, apart from a pair of failed British submarine attacks. Reduced to a torpedo testing and target ship by early 1916, she was disarmed and converted into a barracks ship in early 1917, seeing no further activity during the war.

Among the few major warships that Germany was permitted to retain under the Treaty of Versailles, Amazone served after the war in the Reichsmarine (Navy of the Realm) after being modernized and rearmed in 1921–1923. She took part in training exercises and cruises abroad through the rest of the 1920s, frequently to ports in Scandinavia, but also as far as the Mediterranean Sea. Decommissioned in 1930, she was again reduced to a barracks hulk, serving in that capacity through World War II and into the postwar years. Left unused beginning in 1951, she was ultimately broken up in 1954, the last-surviving member of the Gazelle class.

== Design ==
Following the construction of the unprotected cruisers of the Bussard class and the aviso Hela for the German Kaiserliche Marine (Imperial Navy), the Construction Department of the Reichsmarineamt (Imperial Navy Office) prepared a design for a new small cruiser that combined the best attributes of both types of vessels. The designers had to design a small cruiser with armor protection that had an optimal combination of speed, armament, and stability necessary for fleet operations, along with the endurance to operate on foreign stations in the German colonial empire. The resulting Gazelle design provided the basis for all of the light cruisers built by the German fleet to the last official designs prepared in 1914.

Plan, profile, and cross-section of the Gazelle class

Amazone was 104.8 meters (343 ft 10 in) long overall and had a beam of 12.2 m (40 ft) and a draft of 5.12 m (16 ft 10 in) forward. She displaced 2,659 t (2,617 long tons) normally and up to 3,082 t (3,033 long tons) at full combat load. The ship had a minimal superstructure, which consisted of a small conning tower and bridge structure. Her hull had a raised forecastle and quarterdeck, along with a pronounced ram bow. She was fitted with two pole masts. She had a crew of 14 officers and 243 enlisted men.

Her propulsion system consisted of two triple-expansion steam engines driving a pair of screw propellers. The engines were powered by ten coal-fired Marine-type water-tube boilers that were vented through a pair of funnels. They were designed to give 8,000 metric horsepower (7,900 ihp), for a top speed of 21.5 knots (39.8 km/h; 24.7 mph). Amazone carried 560 t (550 long tons; 620 short tons) of coal, which gave her a range of 3,560 nautical miles (6,590 km; 4,100 mi) at 10 knots (19 km/h; 12 mph).

The ship was armed with ten 10.5 cm (4.1 in) SK L/40 guns in single pivot mounts. Two were placed side by side forward on the forecastle; six were located on the broadside in sponsons; and two were placed side by side aft. The guns could engage targets out to 12,200 m (13,300 yd). They were supplied with 1,000 rounds of ammunition, for 100 shells per gun. She was also equipped with two 45 cm (17.7 in) torpedo tubes with five torpedoes. They were submerged in the hull on the broadside.

The ship was protected by an armored deck that was 20 to 25 mm (0.79 to 0.98 in) thick. The deck sloped downward at the sides of the ship to provide a measure of protection against incoming fire. The conning tower had 80 mm (3.1 in) thick sides, and the guns were protected by 50 mm (2 in) thick gun shields.

== Service history ==
=== Construction – 1902 ===
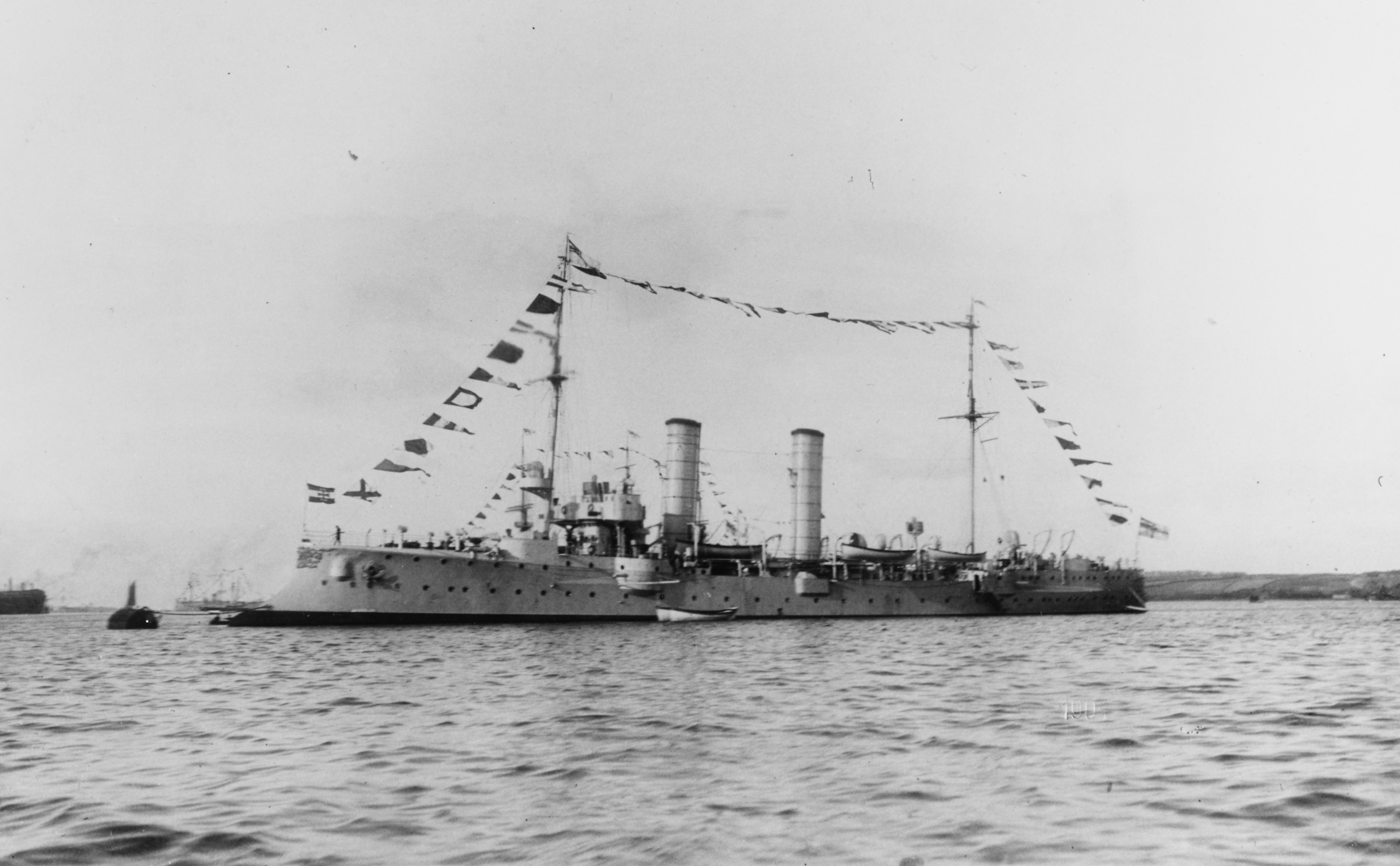
One of the Gazelle-class cruisers, possibly Amazone, in Kiel in 1901

Amazone was ordered under the contract name "F", (Note: German warships were ordered under provisional names. Additions to the fleet were given a single letter; ships intended to replace older or lost vessels were ordered as "Ersatz (name of the ship to be replaced)".) and was laid down at the Germaniawerft shipyard in Kiel in December 1899 and was launched on 6 October 1900. At her launching ceremony, Vizeadmiral (Vice Admiral) Alfred von Tirpitz gave a speech and Princess Hilda of Nassau christened the ship. After fitting-out work was completed, she underwent builder's sea trials before being was commissioned on 15 November 1901 for acceptance trials conducted by the navy. Her first commander was Korvettenkapitän (KK—Corvette Captain) Ludwig Bruch. After her commissioning, Amazone was employed in the reconnaissance forces of the German fleet, joining the fleet screen on 21 December.

The ship took part in squadron training in the Baltic Sea in March 1902, followed by a voyage around the British Isles that began on 24 April. While passing near the Sevenstones Lightship on 24 May, the battleship Kaiser Wilhelm II accidentally rammed Amazone, striking her aft of her forward mast, causing extensive flooding that filled several compartments with water. Amazone nevertheless remained afloat and able to steam under her own power, and she arrived at the Kaiserliche Werft (Imperial Shipyard) in Kiel three days later. This was the first in a series of accidents that made Amazone, according to the historians Hans Hildebrand, Albert Röhr, and Hans-Otto Steinmetz, the most accident-prone vessel of the Imperial fleet. The ship was under repair until the end of July.

After completing repairs, Amazone joined the battleships of I Squadron for maneuvers in the Kattegat and the North Sea. In August, she took part in the annual maneuvers held with the combined fleet; these were also conducted in the North Sea, between 17 August and 11 September. During the exercises, she operated with I Scouting Group, and she was detached to Hamburg from 5 to 6 September. Amazone had the auxiliary hospital ship Hansa tied alongside for training, which caused damage to Amazone's hull, necessitating further repairs at the Kaiserliche Werft in Kiel that began on 21 September. Bruch left the ship at that time, and KK Gerhard Gerdes took command of the ship in October. The naval command initially planned to send Amazone to join the German squadron participating in the naval blockade of Venezuela of 1902–1903, but she was instead kept in European waters, being sent with I Squadron for its winter cruise to Bergen, Norway in December.

=== 1903–1905 ===
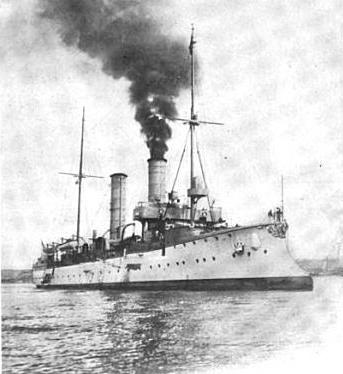
Amazone, c. 1902–1903

On 1 March 1903, the Reconnaissance Unit was created under the command of Konteradmiral (Rear Admiral) Ludwig Borckenhagen, and Amazone was assigned to the organization. The ships joined I Squadron for a training cruise into the Atlantic on 7 May, travelling as far as Spain. During the voyage, Amazone was detached to Brest, France on 2 June to pick up mail for the fleet. While approaching the harbor, she ran aground on an uncharted rock outside the breakwater. The French had failed to send out a pilot boat to guide Amazone into the harbor, but they assisted with refloating the vessel at high tide. Amazone then returned to Kiel, where upon inspection, she was found to have been undamaged in the accident. Nevertheless, a court martial was held aboard the hulk Kronprinz to investigate the accident. Gerdes and the navigation officer were sentenced to being confined to their quarters for a few days, but he nevertheless remained in command of the vessel. From 4 to 30 July, Amazone took part in squadron exercises in the North Sea. The annual fleet maneuvers followed from 15 August to 12 September, and the training year ended with a winter cruise from 23 November to 5 December.

The ships of the Reconnaissance Unit began the year 1904 with training exercises in the Skagerrak, followed by further maneuvers in the central Baltic. In April, KK Leberecht Maass replaced Gerdes. Amazone served as the flotilla leader for I Torpedo-boat Flotilla for exercises on 6 April off the Baltic coast of Schleswig-Holstein before the ships moved to the North Sea for additional maneuvers that lasted until 20 May, after which KK Rudolf Berger replaced Maass. After returning to the Reconnaissance Unit, she took part in a cruise to Britain and the Netherlands from 23 July to 12 August. After anchoring in the Kieler Förde on 12 August, Amazone was struck by the Russian barque Anna, though she was not seriously damaged in the accident. It nevertheless contributed to the ship's reputation for being prone to accidents. She then joined the fleet for its annual maneuvers that were conducted between 29 August and 15 September.

Squadron training with the Reconnaissance Unit took place in January 1905. During exercises with the torpedo boat training flotilla on 3 March, Amazone collided with the torpedo boat D6. She towed D6 back to Kiel and then went into dry dock for repairs that lasted for three weeks. On 4 April, Amazone resumed her previous year's activities as a flotilla leader, and Maass came back aboard for the next month. She operated with I Torpedo-boat Flotilla during maneuvers held off Sassnitz until 21 May. Now-Fregattenkapitän (FK—Frigate Captain) Berger once again relieved Maass after the ship returned to the Reconnaissance Unit. Late in the month, she joined her squadron-mates for exercises in the North Sea. These activities continued through July, along with visits to Norwegian ports. The fleet maneuvers followed in August and were held in the North and Baltic Seas. After their conclusion, Amazone was replaced in the Reconnaissance Unit by the light cruiser Berlin and she was decommissioned in Kiel on 28 September, being placed in reserve, where she remained for the next nine years.

=== World War I ===
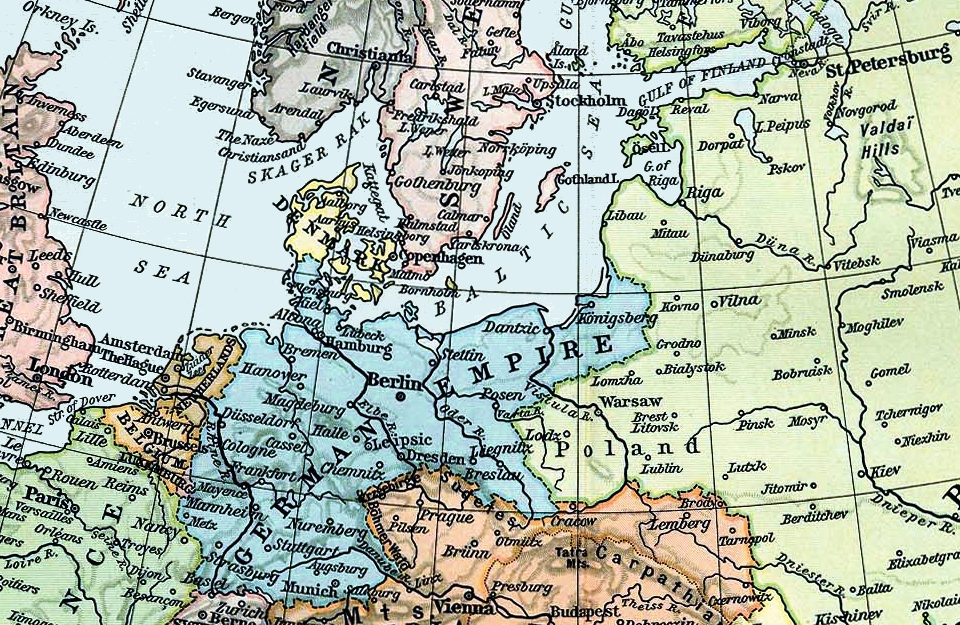
Map of the North and Baltic Seas in 1911

==== 1914 ====
Following the outbreak of World War I in July 1914, Amazone was recommissioned on 2 August under the command of KK Johannes Horn; she briefly served as the flagship of KAdm Robert Mischke, the commander of the Coastal Defense Division of the Baltic Sea, from 6 to 8 August. The unit included six other light cruisers, the old protected cruiser Freya, and the gunboat Panther, among other vessels. Through the month, she patrolled the western and central Baltic as far north as Gotland, and the coast of Russia. She was ordered to destroy a Russian radio tower near Libau, but by the time she arrived, the Russians had already dismantled it and removed it. During this period, the airship M IV landed on Amazone's deck, as part of an experiment to determine if a warship could tow an airship to the eastern Baltic for operations there. The tests revealed that Amazone could only steam at very low speed to avoid damaging M IV; even wave action from the wakes of a group of passing torpedo boats while Amazone was anchored forced the airship captain to sever the tow lines.

Initial experience in the war led the German naval command to divide Mischke's responsibilities, leaving him with defensive operations in the western Baltic, while separating offensive operations to a new Detached Division under KAdm Ehler Behring. Amazone was assigned to the unit and her first operation was to escort the U-boat U-3 to Dagerort. She next embarked on a sweep into the central Baltic with the light cruisers Augsburg and Magdeburg on 26 August. Amazone took up an advanced position ahead of Behring's other cruisers, and during the operation, Magdeburg ran aground off the lighthouse at Odensholm on the Estonian coast. Upon receiving a report of the incident, Amazone turned back to come to Magdeburg's aid, but by the time she arrived, Russian cruisers had already appeared and Magdeburg's crew had detonated scuttling charges. Amazone embarked part of her crew and carried them to Danzig. On 30 August, Amazone conducted another patrol in the area off Gotland that resulted in no contact with Russian forces.

Another operation took place on 7 September, during a sortie led by the large armored cruiser Blücher. Amazone was sent to screen the vessel by cruising off Gotska Sandön to prevent the formation from being outflanked. The battleships of IV Battle Squadron and Amazone then conducted a demonstration off Windau the next day. Amazone then returned to Danzig before being sent to assist in the defense of Memel from 12 to 16 September. U3 and the torpedo boat S126 also took part in the operation. Amazone sent a landing party ashore, but they took part in no fighting. The Germans planned a major amphibious assault on Windau later that month; the IV Squadron battleships were to lead the operation, while those of V Battle Squadron were to carry German Army units. Amazone escorted minesweepers as they cleared the route on 24 September and during this work, she shelled a Russian lighthouse. The attack was called off after reports incorrectly indicated that British cruisers and submarines were preparing to break into the Baltic through the Danish Straits, necessitating a redeployment of German warships to the western Baltic.

Amazone conducted another sweep to Windau on 9–10 October, during which she had to take the U-boat U-25 under tow after the submarine's engine broke down. The next operation, to shell Libau and block the harbor entrance with blockships, began on 17 November. Behring's flagship, the armored cruiser Friedrich Carl, struck a pair of naval mines and sank, but Amazone and the light cruiser Lübeck, along with their accompanying torpedo boats, entered Libau and bombarded the port. From 18 November to 15 December, Amazone was tasked with patrolling Danzig Bay, with occasional stints in the Aarøsund. On 15 December, Amazone joined Behring's new flagship, the armored cruiser Prinz Adalbert, and the light cruisers Thetis, Augsburg, and Lübeck for a reconnaissance sweep toward Åland at the northern end of the Baltic. On the way north, Amazone proved to be unable to keep pace with the other cruisers, so she was detached off Gotska Sandön to return to port. From 26 to 30 December, she escorted the V Squadron battleships on a sortie to Gotland.

==== 1915–1918 ====
In April 1915, Amazone was transferred back to the Coastal Defense Division. She underwent an overhaul after arriving in the western Baltic and thereafter embarked on patrols in the region. She frequently operated with her sister ships Medusa and Undine between Sassnitz and Trelleborg, in the Aarøsund, and around the island of Langeland. On 8 May, Amazone was patrolling off Cape Arkona when she was attacked by the British submarine HMS E1. The submarine fired a torpedo from a range of 1,100 m (1,200 yd), but it missed Amazone. On 9 September, another British submarine, HMS E18, unsuccessfully attacked Amazone during the Battle of the Gulf of Riga. On 11 February 1916, Amazone was sent to Libau, which had by that time been captured by German forces, to defend the port as a replacement for the cruiser München, remaining there until 24 February.

In March 1916, Amazone was released from the Coastal Defense Division and assigned to the U-boat Inspectorate for use as a target ship. She filled this role for the rest of her time in commission during the war. At the same time, her torpedo armament was expanded, though the number and type of torpedo tubes added are unknown. After sea trials in early April, her crew was reduced and between July and September, all of her 10.5 cm guns were removed, leaving her with a gun armament of just six 8.8 cm (3.5 in) weapons. The ship was decommissioned on 14 March 1917, after which she was disarmed completely and reduced to a barracks ship for the Torpedo Inspectorate. According to Hildebrand, Röhr, and Steinmetz, surviving records do not indicate whether she was based in Kiel or Wilhelmshaven, with I Torpedo Division or II Torpedo Division, respectively, but the naval historian Erich Gröner states that she was stationed in Kiel during this period. She served in this capacity through the end of the war in November 1918.

=== Later career ===
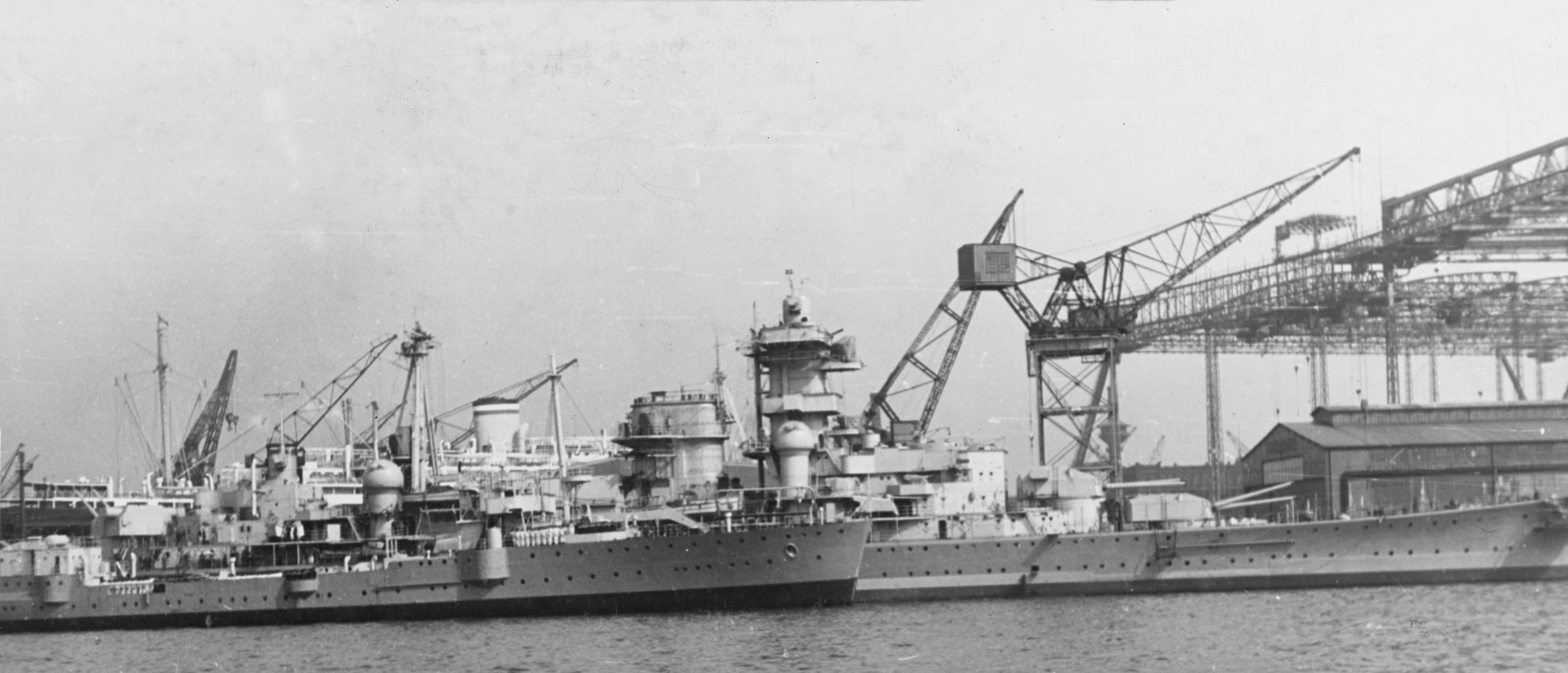
Amazone (left) alongside the heavy cruiser Admiral Hipper at the Blohm & Voss shipyard in Hamburg in 1939

The Treaty of Versailles that ended the war permitted Germany to retain six light cruisers, and Amazone was among those kept in service of the newly reorganized Reichsmarine. She was modernized and rearmed at the Reichsmarine Werft in Wilhelmshaven between 1921 and 1923. Her ram bow was replaced with a clipper bow, and she received a new battery of ten 10.5 cm SK L/45 guns in U-boat mountings and two 50 cm (20 in) torpedo tubes in deck launchers. She was recommissioned on 1 December 1923 under the command of Kapitän zur See (KzS—Captain at Sea) Walter Gladisch to replace her sister Arcona She joined the light forces of the Marinestation der Nordsee (North Sea Naval Station), operating with the light cruiser Hamburg and II. Torpedo-boat Flotilla. She spent the year 1924 conducting training exercises and visits abroad, including a summer training cruise with the fleet to Bodø, Norway.

In March 1925, KzS Eduard Eichel relieved Gladisch. Amazone repeated the same pattern of training with the fleet and visits to foreign ports that year, including a cruise to Rotterdam, Netherlands and fleet exercises in the Eidangerfjord in Norway from 25 June to 1 July. She went on a longer cruise to the Mediterranean Sea in May and June 1926, in addition to her normal training duties, and in September, FK Alfred Saalwächter took command of the ship. In 1927, she embarked on a major cruise into the Atlantic with the rest of the fleet, which lasted from 28 March to 16 June; in September, FK Albrecht Meißner took command of the vessel. During a visit to Norway in mid-1928 in company with the battleship Schlesien, she stopped in Molde and Merok. Fleet maneuvers were thereafter held off Skagen, Denmark. Amazone largely remained in German waters in 1929 and saw little activity of note, apart from a trip to Gothenburg, Sweden in August.

The Reichsmarine conducted a reorganization of the fleet on 1 January 1930, dividing the ships into tactical units. Amazone was initially assigned to the Reconnaissance Forces Command, under now-KAdm Gladisch, but it was quickly determined that she had little value as a warship by this point, some thirty years after her launch. She was accordingly decommissioned in Wilhelmshaven on 15 January and thereafter used as a barracks ship. She was then struck from the naval register on 31 March 1931 and assigned to the Submarine Acceptance Commission in Kiel. In addition to serving as a barracks, she was later used as an auxiliary for the Warship Construction Test Office. During World War II, she was towed to Bremen, and after the conflict she was used as an accommodation hulk for refugees who had fled from formerly-German occupied territories in eastern Europe. She lay idle and unused from 1951 to 1954, and plans to convert her into a floating youth center came to nothing. The old cruiser was ultimately broken up for scrap in 1954 in Hamburg; she was the last member of the Gazelle class to be scrapped.
