= Aksel Berg =

Soviet scientist and admiral

Aksel Ivanovich Berg
- Аксель Иванович Берг
- Born: 10 November [O.S. 29 October] 1893; Orenburg, Russian Empire
- Died: 9 June 1979 (aged 85); Moscow, USSR
- Military career
- Allegiance: Russian Empire; Soviet Union
- Branch: Imperial Russian Navy, Soviet Navy
- Service years: 1914–1953
- Rank: Admiral
- Commands: head of the Soviet Naval Research Institute
- Conflicts: World War I Russian Civil War; World War II
- Awards: Hero of Socialist Labour

Aksel Ivanovich Berg (Russian: Аксель Иванович Берг; 10 November [O.S. 29 October] 1893 – 9 July 1979) was a Soviet scientist in radio-frequency engineering and Soviet Navy Admiral, Hero of Socialist Labour. He was a key figure in the introduction of cybernetics to the Soviet Union.

== Early life ==
Aksel Martin Berg was born on October 29 (November 10), 1893 in Orenburg to the family of Lieutenant General Ivan (Johann) Alexandrovich Berg (1830–1900), of Finland-Swedish origin; his mother was Italian. After Berg's father died, the family moved to Saint Petersburg and Aksel was matriculated to navy school. Berg joined the Imperial Russian Navy in 1914 and served as junior navigating officer on the Russian battleship Tsesarevich and as liaison officer on the British submarine HMS E8, which was operating in the Baltic in alliance with Russia. In 1916, Berg was promoted to the rank of lieutenant.

== Soviet times ==
=== Before the German-Soviet war ===
After the revolution Berg served in the Red Navy 1918–22. In 1918 he participated in the Ice Cruise of the Baltic Fleet. In 1919 he was navigating officer on the submarine Pantera when it sank the British destroyer HMS Vittoria with two torpedoes near Seskar Island on August 31, 1919, bringing the first victory to Soviet submariners.

Berg subsequently commanded the submarines Rys, Volk and Zmeya. In preparing Zmeya for combat operations he suffered an injury that, left untreated, seriously weakened his health; following his return to port Berg was restricted to onshore duty. Berg was awarded the title of "Hero of Labor of the Separate Submarine Division of the Baltic Fleet" in 1922 for his work restoring the submarine.

In 1922, he participated in the development of the "Rules for Service on Submarines". From 1927 he was assigned to the navy radio electronics department and was the chairman of the radio communications and radio navigation section of the Scientific and Technical Committee of the Red Army Navy. From 1932 to 1937 he headed the Marine Research Institute of Communications and Telemechanics (NIMIST). On 26 November 1935, Berg was awarded the military rank of engineer-flagship of the 2nd rank.

Berg completed his education at the Saint Petersburg Polytechnical University, then at the electrical engineering department of the Naval Academy, which he graduated with honors in 1925. After graduating from the academy, he taught at the Naval Engineering School. As a teacher at the Naval Engineering School, he created a radio laboratory at the school and was engaged in scientific research in the field of radio. In 1932, the laboratory was transformed into a research institute, with Berg appointed as its head.

=== Imprisoned and rehabilitated ===
On 25 December 1937, he was arrested on charges of participating in a counter-revolutionary organization and sabotage and was imprisoned while under investigation until May 28, 1940. After being beaten by his interrogators he confessed to having carried out espionage activities for the Swiss Navy for several years; he later retracted his confession.

Although all charges carried the death penalty, Berg supervised the development of military communications systems while imprisoned in a sharashka, one of the "special design bureaus" of the NKVD. He was not convicted, and on 28 May 1940 he was released "due to lack of evidence" and the case was closed. He was, however, only rehabilitated posthumously only on 18 October 1991.

=== Service during World War II ===
When Stalin became interested in developing radar Berg was immediately appointed as minister of electronic technology of the USSR. He developed the Redut-K air-warning radar which was placed aboard the light cruiser Molotov in April 1941. Molotov´s device enabled her to play a key role in the air defense of Sevastopol in the first stages of Operation Barbarossa. On May 21, 1941, Berg was promoted to Engineer-Rear-Admiral, then in 1944 to Engineer-Vice-Admiral.

From July 1943 to October 1944, he was Deputy People's Commissar of the Electrical Industry. At the same time, from 1943 to 1947, he was Deputy Chairman of the State Defense Committee's Council on Radar; its chairman was Georgy Malenkov. He was a founder and the first director of the "All-Union Scientific Research Institute of Radar" (now the A. I. Berg Central Scientific Research Institute of Radiolocation). In September 1943, he was elected a Corresponding Member of the Academy of Sciences of the Soviet Union in the Department of Technical Sciences. He became a member of the CPSU in 1944.

=== After the war ===
After the war he was elected a full member of the Academy of Sciences in 1946. In 1953, the Institute of Radio Engineering and Electronics was opened as part of the academy' Berg became its first director, holding this post until 1955.

In parallel with his work in the Radar Council, Berg was also a member of the Missile Committee. He was one of the founders, and later the editor, of the extensive popular science book series "Mass Radio Library", published since 1947.

Berg was promoted to Engineer-Admiral in 1955 and served as a Deputy Minister of Defence from 1953 to 1957. In May 1957, at his personal request, due to a severe heart attack, he was relieved of his Ministerial responsibilities. In September 1960, he left military service.

In 1958 he founded and led the Scientific Council on Complex Problems in Cybernetics. He oversaw the expansion of Computer Center No. 1, established in 1954 by Berg's friend Anatoly Kitov as part of the Ministry of Defense, into one of the largest computer centers in the world. His main interests were radiolocation, microelectronics and cybernetics (i.e. computer science and radio-frequency engineering); he also made a significant contribution to the development of bionics, structural linguistics, and artificial intelligence in the USSR.

In February 1959, Berg headed the government commission to consider proposals from Kitov to the Nikita Khrushchev on the creation of a Unified State Network of Computer Centers (EGSVC, the prototype of the Internet) in the country to manage the national economy. The commission approved Kitov's proposals.

=== Death ===
Aksel Berg died in Moscow in 1979 and is buried at Novodevichy Cemetery.

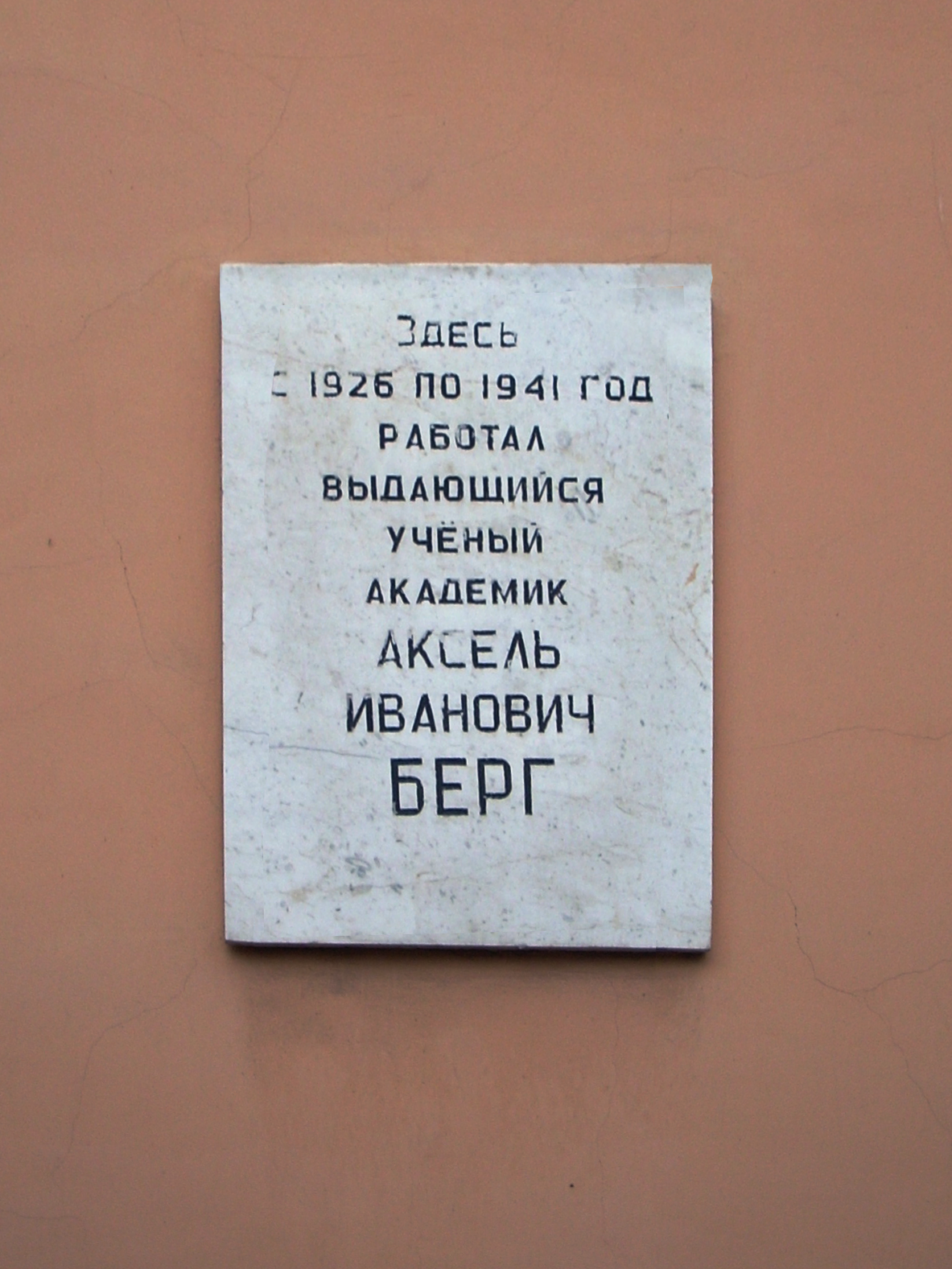
Plaque to commemorate Aksel Berg at the Saint Petersburg State Electrotechnical University

== Selected publications ==
Berg A., (1964), 'Cybernetics and Education' in The Anglo-Soviet Journal, March 1964, pp. 13–20 (English language)

== Honours and awards ==
- Hero of Socialist Labour (10 November 1963) Decree of the Presidium of the Supreme Soviet "for outstanding achievements in the development of radio engineering and in connection with the 70th anniversary of Aksel Ivanovich Berg"
- Four Orders of Lenin
- Order of the October Revolution
- Order of the Red Banner, twice
- Order of the Patriotic War, 1st class
- Order of the Red Star, three times
- Popov Gold Medal (13 April 1951)
- Medal "For the Victory over Germany in the Great Patriotic War 1941–1945"
- Jubilee Medal "Twenty Years of Victory in the Great Patriotic War 1941-1945"
- Jubilee Medal "XX Years of the Workers' and Peasants' Red Army"
- Jubilee Medal "30 Years of the Soviet Army and Navy"
- Jubilee Medal "40 Years of the Armed Forces of the USSR"
- Jubilee Medal "50 Years of the Armed Forces of the USSR"
