= Prince Adalbert =

Prince Adalbert may refer to

- Prince Adalbert of Prussia (1811–1873), Prussian admiral
- Prince Adalbert of Bavaria (1828–1875), son of Ludwig I of Bavaria and Therese of Saxe-Hildburghausen
- Prince Adalbert of Prussia (1884–1948), son of Wilhelm II, German Emperor and Princess Augusta Victoria of Schleswig-Holstein
- Prince Adalbert of Bavaria (1886–1970), German prince, author, and diplomat

== See also ==
- Prinz Adalbert (disambiguation)
