= SMS S116 =

S90-class torpedo boat

History

German Empire
- Name: SMS S116
- Builder: Schichau-Werke, Elbing
- Launched: 14 October 1902
- Commissioned: 28 March 1903
- Fate: Torpedoed and sunk, 6 October 1914

General characteristics
- Class & type: S90-class torpedo boat
- Displacement: 415 t (408 long tons)
- Length: 63.0 m (206 ft 8 in)
- Beam: 7.0 m (23 ft 0 in)
- Draft: 2.69 m (8 ft 10 in)
- Installed power: 5,900 PS (5,800 ihp; 4,300 kW)
- Propulsion: 3 × boilers; 2 × 3-cylinder triple expansion engines
- Speed: 27 kn (50 km/h; 31 mph)
- Range: 980 nmi (1,810 km; 1,130 mi) at 17 kn (31 km/h; 20 mph)
- Complement: 49 officers and sailors
- Armament: 3 × 5.0 cm (2.0 in) L/40 guns; 3 × 450 mm torpedo tubes

SMS S116 (Note: "SMS" stands for "Seiner Majestät Schiff" ('His Majesty's Ship')) (Note: The "S" in S116 denoted the shipbuilder who constructed her.) was a S90-class torpedo boat of the Imperial German Navy that served during the First World War. The ship was built by Schichau at Elbing in Prussia (now Elbląg in Poland), and was completed in March 1903. The ship was torpedoed and sunk by the British submarine E9 on 6 October 1914.

== Construction and design ==
The S90-class consisted of 48 torpedo-boats, built between 1898 and 1907 by Schichau and Germaniawerft for the Imperial German Navy. They were larger than previous German torpedo-boats, allowing them to work effectively with the High Seas Fleet in the North Sea, while also being large enough to act as flotilla leader when necessary, thus eliminating the need for separate larger division boats.

S116 was one of a group of six torpedo boats built by Schichau between 1902 and 1903. She was launched from Schichau's Elbing shipyard on 14 October 1902 and commissioned on 28 March 1903.

S116 was 63.2 metres (207 ft 4 in) long overall and 63.0 metres (206 ft 8 in) at the waterline, with a beam of 7.0 metres (23 ft 0 in) and a draft of 2.69 metres (8 ft 10 in). Displacement was 315 tonnes (310 long tons) normal and 415 tonnes (408 long tons) deep load. Three coal-fired Thornycroft three-drum water-tube boilers fed steam to 2 sets of 3-cylinder triple expansion steam engines rated at 5,900 PS (5,800 ihp; 4,300 kW), giving a design speed of 27 knots (50 km/h; 31 mph), with speeds of 28 knots (52 km/h; 32 mph) reached during sea trials. 102 tonnes (100 long tons) of coal was carried, giving a range of 980 nautical miles (1,810 km; 1,130 mi) at 17 knots (31 km/h; 20 mph).

While the S90-class were of similar size to contemporary foreign torpedo-boat destroyers, the German navy saw their role as primarily torpedo attack against opposing fleets, rather than defending their own fleet against attack, so the ships had a lighter gun armament than British destroyers, and a lower silhouette to avoid detection during night attacks. S116 had a gun armament of three 5 cm SK L/40 guns in single mounts, while torpedo armament consisted of three single 450 mm torpedo tubes (one in a well deck between the raised forecastle and the bridge, with the remaining two tubes aft of the bridge. Two reload torpedoes were carried. The ship had a complement of 49 officers and men.

== Service ==
In May 1904 S116 was part of the 6th Torpedo-boat Division of the 1st Torpedo-boat Flotilla, while in 1907, she was listed as part of the 8th Half-flotilla of the 2nd School Flotilla, remaining part of the 8th Half-Flotilla in 1908. In 1910, she was listed as part of the 9th Half-Flotilla of the 5th Torpedoboat Flotilla, remaining there until 1912. In 1913 S116 was fitted with new boilers. In 1914, S116 formed part of the 7th Half-Flotilla of the 4th Torpedo-boat Flotilla.

S116 remained part of the 7th Half-Flotilla on the outbreak of the First World War in August 1914. On 6 October 1914, S116 was on patrol off the western entrance to the river Ems with S117, when she was spotted by the British submarine E9, commanded by Max Horton, one of three submarines (Note: E9, E3 and E6) that had been deployed as part of an abortive operation by the Harwich Force against the German patrols off the Ems estuary. The submarines had already left base when the surface part of the operation had been cancelled. E9 fired two torpedoes at S116, one of which hit the torpedo boat, which broke in two and quickly sank. Nine of S116's crew were killed, with S117 and S118 rescuing the survivors. E9 escaped successfully.

== Bibliography ==
- Chesneau, Roger; Kolesnik, Eugene M., eds. (1979). Conway's All the World's Fighting Ships 1860–1905. London: Conway Maritime Press. ISBN 0-85177-133-5.
- Corbett, Julian S. (1920). Naval Operations: Volume I: To the Battle of the Falklands December 1914. History of the Great War: Based on Official Documents. London: Longmans Green & Co.
- Fock, Harald (1989). Z-Vor! Internationale Entwicklung und Kriegseinsätze von Zerstörern und Torpedobooten 1914 bis 1939 (in German). Herford, Germany: Koehlers Verlagsgesellschaft mBH. ISBN 3-7822-0207-4.
- Gardiner, Robert; Gray, Randal, eds. (1985). Conway's All The World's Fighting Ships 1906–1921. London: Conway Maritime Press. ISBN 0-85177-245-5.
- Groos, O. (1920). Der Krieg in der Nordsee: Erster Band: Von Kriegsbeginn bis Anfang September 1914. Der Krieg zur See: 1914–1918 (in German). Berlin: Verlag von E. S. Mittler und Sohn – via National Library of Estonia.
- Gröner, Erich (1983). Die deutschen Kriegsschiffe 1815–1945: Band 2: Torpedoboote, Zerstörer, Schnelleboote, Minensuchboote, Minenräumboote. Koblenz, Germany: Bernard & Graefe Verlag. ISBN 3-7637-4801-6.
- Viscount Hythe (1912). The Naval Annual 1912. Portsmouth, UK: J. Griffin and Co.
- Jane, Fred T. (1970) [Originally published by Sampson Low, Marston & Co. Ltd. London: 1906]. Jane's Fighting Ships 1906–7. London: David & Charles (Publishers). ISBN 0-7153-4715-2.
- Monograph No. 24: Home Waters—Part II.: September and October 1914 (PDF). Naval Staff Monographs (Historical). Vol. XI. The Naval Staff, Training and Staff Duties Division. 1924.
