= SMS Undine =

Light cruiser of the German Imperial Navy

Coordinates: 54°59′N 13°51′E

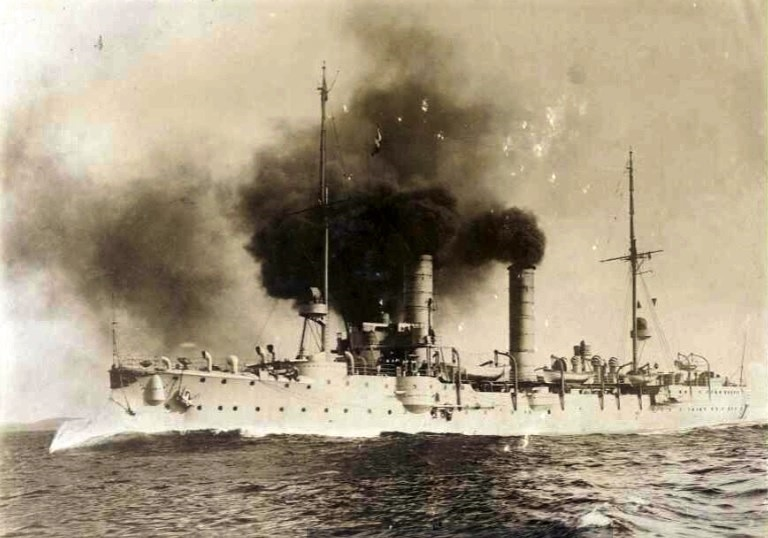
- Undine steaming at speed

History

German Empire
- Name: Undine
- Namesake: Undine
- Builder: Howaldtswerke
- Laid down: 28 September 1901
- Launched: 11 December 1902
- Commissioned: 5 January 1904
- Fate: Sunk, 7 November 1915

General characteristics
- Class & type: Gazelle-class cruiser
- Displacement: Normal: 2,706 t (2,663 long tons); Full load: 3,112 t (3,063 long tons)
- Length: 105 m (344 ft) loa
- Beam: 12.4 m (40.7 ft)
- Draft: 4.81 m (15.8 ft)
- Installed power: 8 × water-tube boilers; 8,000 PS (7,900 ihp)
- Propulsion: 2 × triple-expansion steam engines; 2 × screw propellers
- Speed: 21.5 kn (39.8 km/h; 24.7 mph)
- Range: 4,400 nmi (8,100 km; 5,100 mi) at 12 knots (22 km/h; 14 mph)
- Complement: 14 officers; 256 enlisted men
- Armament: 10 × 10.5 cm (4.1 in) SK L/40 guns; 2 × 45 cm (17.7 in) torpedo tubes
- Armor: Deck: 20 to 25 mm (0.79 to 0.98 in); Conning tower 80 mm (3.1 in); Gun shields: 50 mm (2 in)

SMS Undine (Note: "SMS" stands for "Seiner Majestät Schiff" (German: His Majesty's Ship).) was the last member of the ten-ship Gazelle class of light cruisers that were built for the German Kaiserliche Marine (Imperial Navy) in the late 1890s and early 1900s. The Gazelle class was the culmination of earlier unprotected cruiser and aviso designs, combining the best aspects of both types in what became the progenitor of all future light cruisers of the Imperial fleet. Built to be able to serve with the main German fleet and as a colonial cruiser, she was armed with a battery of ten 10.5 cm (4.1 in) guns and had a top speed of 21.5 knots (39.8 km/h; 24.7 mph). Undine was a modified version of the basic Gazelle design, with improved armor and additional coal storage for a longer cruising range.

Undine was initially used as an artillery training ship for the gunners of the German fleet. She also took part in training maneuvers with other elements of the fleet, and during one of these exercises in November 1905, she accidentally rammed and sank the torpedo boat SMS S126. The ship remained in German waters, making only a single visit to a foreign port in 1909. Undine remained in service through mid-1912. During this period, in addition to her training duties, she served as an auxiliary icebreaker.

After the outbreak of World War I in August 1914, Undine was deployed to the Baltic Sea, serving in the Coastal Defense Division. She was tasked with patrolling the western Baltic and she also participated in offensive operations against Russian forces. She was attacked by the British submarine HMS E19 on 7 November 1915 and was hit by two torpedoes, the second of which detonated the ship's ammunition magazines. Undine exploded and sank, but casualties were relatively light, with fourteen or twenty-five killed in the sinking out of a normal crew of 270.

== Design ==
Following the construction of the unprotected cruisers of the Bussard class and the aviso Hela for the German Kaiserliche Marine (Imperial Navy), the Construction Department of the Reichsmarineamt (Imperial Navy Office) prepared a design for a new small cruiser that combined the best attributes of both types of vessels. The designers had to design a small cruiser with armor protection that had an optimal combination of speed, armament, and stability necessary for fleet operations, along with the endurance to operate on foreign stations in the German colonial empire. The resulting Gazelle design provided the basis for all of the light cruisers built by the German fleet to the last official designs prepared in 1914. After the first seven ships had been built or were under construction, the Construction Department improved the design slightly, strengthening the armor on the conning tower and increasing the beam by 0.2 m (7.9 in), which allowed more space for coal storage, and thus a longer cruising radius. These changes were applied to the last three members of the class: Undine, Arcona, and Frauenlob.

Plan, profile, and cross-section of the Gazelle class

Undine was 105 meters (344 ft 6 in) long overall, and had a beam of 12.4 m (40 ft 8 in) and a draft of 4.81 m (15 ft 9 in) forward. She displaced 2,706 t (2,663 long tons) normally and up to 3,112 t (3,063 long tons) at full combat load. The ship had a minimal superstructure, which consisted of a small conning tower and bridge structure. Her hull had a raised forecastle and quarterdeck, along with a pronounced ram bow. She was fitted with two pole masts. She had a crew of 14 officers and 256 enlisted men.

Her propulsion system consisted of two triple-expansion steam engines manufactured by Howaldtswerke driving a pair of screw propellers. The engines were powered by eight coal-fired Marine-type water-tube boilers that were vented through a pair of funnels. They were designed to give 8,000 metric horsepower (7,900 ihp), for a top speed of 21.5 knots (39.8 km/h; 24.7 mph). Undine carried 700 t (690 long tons) of coal, which gave her a range of 4,400 nautical miles (8,100 km; 5,100 mi) at 12 knots (22 km/h; 14 mph).

The ship was armed with ten 10.5 cm (4.1 in) SK L/40 guns in single pivot mounts. Two were placed side by side forward on the forecastle; six were located on the broadside in sponsons; and two were placed side by side aft. The guns could engage targets out to 12,200 m (13,300 yd). They were supplied with 1,500 rounds of ammunition, for 150 shells per gun. She was also equipped with two 45 cm (17.7 in) torpedo tubes with five torpedoes. They were submerged in the hull on the broadside.

The ship was protected by an armored deck that was 20 to 25 mm (0.79 to 0.98 in) thick. The deck sloped downward at the sides of the ship to provide a measure of protection against incoming fire. The conning tower had 80 mm (3.1 in) thick sides, and the guns were protected by 50 mm (2 in) thick gun shields.

== Service history ==
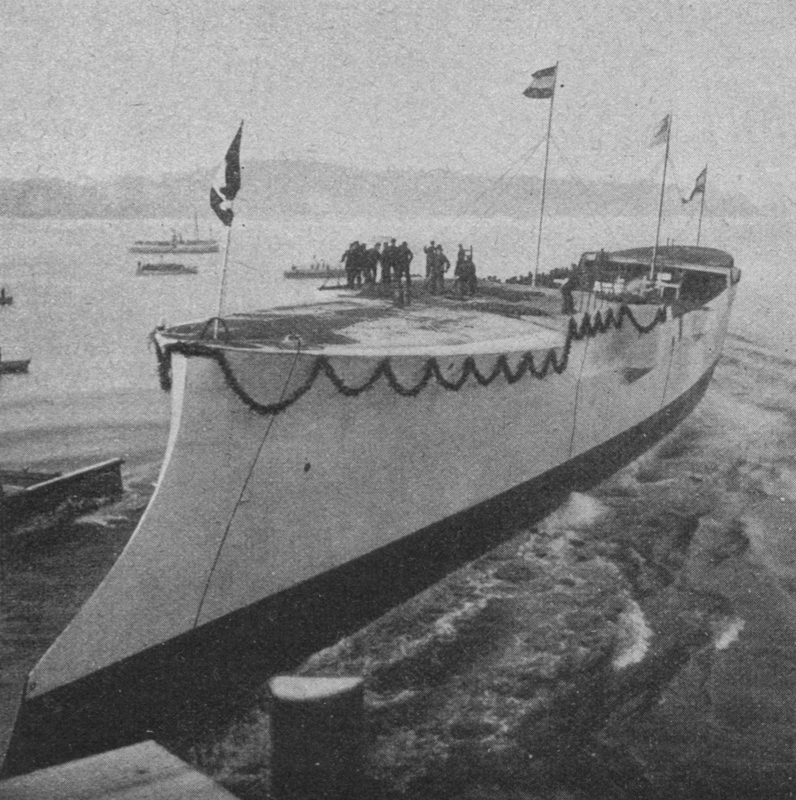
Undine at her launching

=== Construction – 1905 ===
Undine was ordered under the contract name "J", (Note: German warships were ordered under provisional names. Additions to the fleet were given a single letter; ships intended to replace older or lost vessels were ordered as "Ersatz (name of the ship to be replaced)".) and was laid down at the Howaldtswerke shipyard in Kiel on 28 September 1901. She was launched on 11 December 1902, and during the ceremony, Prince Otto zu Salm-Horstmar, the president of the Flottenverein (Navy League), gave a speech. After her launching, fitting-out work commenced, and she was commissioned to begin sea trials on 5 January 1904 under the command of Korvettenkapitän (KK—Corvette Captain) Carl Schaumann. During the trials, she conducted tests with gyrocompasses that were not successful owing to their sensitivity to even moderate swells. After completing her testing on 23 March, she was transferred to Wilhelmshaven and decommissioned there on 30 March. She was recommissioned on 10 January 1905 and was assigned to the training squadron for use as a gunnery training ship to modernize the vessels that were available to train the fleet's gunners; the vessel she replaced was the old screw corvette Carola, which had been launched in 1880. During this period, from 10 January to September, KK Georg Scheidt served as the ship's commander.

Undine underwent another round of trials, which ended when she moved back to Kiel on 4 February. She took part in training exercises from 7 to 19 May held off Alsen, along with other vessels in the training ships assigned to the Inspektion der Schiffsartillerie (Naval Artillery Inspectorate), under the command of Konteradmiral (Rear Admiral) Hugo Zeye. These were followed by further maneuvers held off Rügen. From 1 to 7 August, she cruised with her sister ship Nymphe and several old torpedo boats filled with cork for use as torpedo targets. They also conducted simulated nighttime attacks on Undine to practice defending against them, as the Imperial Japanese Navy had recently demonstrated the effectiveness of such attacks during the Russo-Japanese War. Throughout the year, she took part in the normal peacetime routine of training exercises, which included shooting practice in the waters off Helgoland from 8 to 12 October. KK Berthold Stechow relieved Scheidt in September that year.

She also took part in another round of nighttime torpedo boat exercises with IV Torpedo-boat Flotilla in November. During these maneuvers, on the night of 17 November, she accidentally collided with the torpedo boat S126 off Bülk. The cruiser was steaming with her lights off, and when the torpedo boats approached to conduct a mock torpedo attack, Undine turned her search lights on, which blinded the crew of S126. The torpedo boat inadvertently ran in front of Undine, and the latter rammed the former, slicing her in half. The torpedo boat S127 collided with the still-floating stern. Both halves of the ship sank quickly and one officer and thirty-two enlisted men drowned in the accident. S126's wreck was later raised, reassembled, and returned to service.

=== 1906–1914 ===
From 3 May to 9 June 1906, the ship underwent repairs to her bow as a result of the damage incurred in the collision with S126; the work was performed at the Kaiserliche Werft (Imperial Shipyard) in Wilhelmshaven. She spent the rest of the year conducting training exercises. The year 1907 passed uneventfully, with the only events of note being an overhaul in Wilhelmshaven from 10 to 27 February, and during the annual fleet maneuvers from 25 September to 8 September, she operated with III Squadron. Undine underwent another overhaul from 29 January to 27 March 1908. She was transferred on 1 July to Sonderburg, where the new gunnery school had been opened. In April 1909, KK Ulrich Lübbert took command of the ship. She took part in training exercises in the North Sea in July before returning to Sonderburg by way of the Skagerrak, thereafter visiting Larvik, Norway; this was the only time Undine visited a foreign port. She was assigned to III Scouting Group during that year's fleet exercises, which were held from 29 August to 11 September.

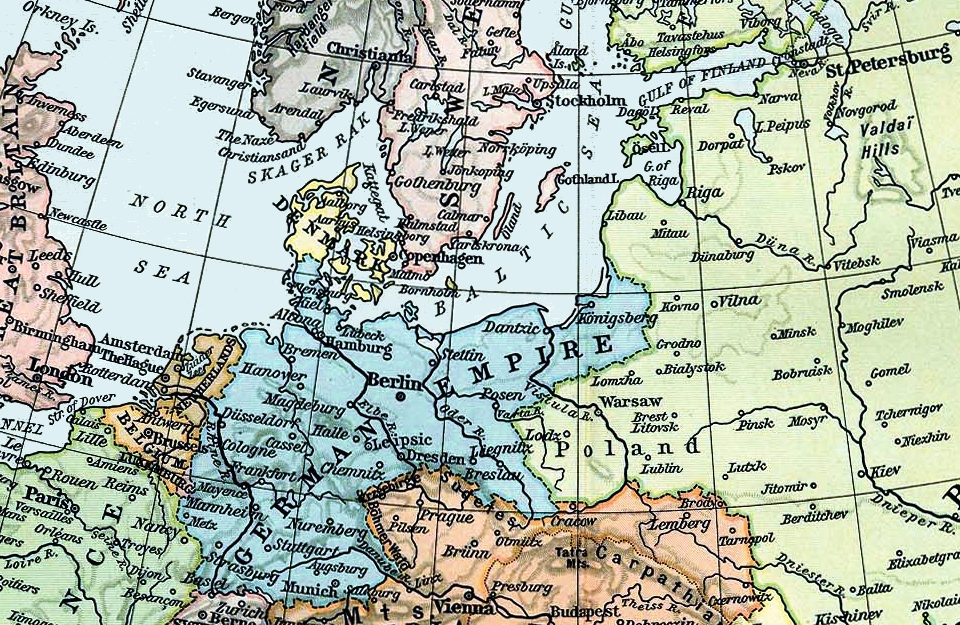
Map of the North and Baltic Seas in 1911

In May 1910, while Undine was steaming off Sonderburg, she encountered the steamship SS Nordstern, which had suffered an engine breakdown. The cruiser took the vessel under tow and pulled her to Kiel. By late in the year, Undine was becoming worn out, which necessitated a major overhaul at the Kaiserliche Werft in Danzig that lasted from 26 September to 17 October. During this period, KK Victor Reclam replaced Lübbert. She took part in a naval review of the High Seas Fleet held for Kaiser Wilhelm II on 5 September. The ship was used as an auxiliary icebreaker in January and February 1912, rescuing three ships that were trapped in the ice in the western Baltic. Undine was assigned to the Training Squadron in April before being decommissioned in Danzig on 12 July for another major overhaul; during this last stint in service, her commander was Fregattenkapitän (Frigate Captain) Andreas Fischer. Following its completion, she was placed in reserve, where she remained through mid-1914.

=== World War I ===
After the outbreak of World War I in July 1914, Undine was recommissioned on 4 August and assigned to the Coastal Defense Division in the western Baltic. She initially patrolled the line between Dornbusch and Møn, and was briefly assigned to the Detached Division under KAdm Ehler Behring. She took part in a sortie into the Gulf of Finland that occurred from 3 to 9 September under the direction of Prince Heinrich of Prussia, the supreme commander of naval forces in the Baltic. While on the operation on 8 September, Undine suffered a machinery breakdown that forced her to return to Danzig and then Kiel for repairs. Twenty-two of her crew were sent aboard the torpedo boat V25 on 14–15 September to reinforce the landing party that had been sent ashore from the cruiser Amazone at Memel, but they were unable to land. Undine was ready for service again on 18 October, thereafter patrolling the area between Trelleborg, Sweden, and Sassnitz, Germany. Over the following months, she served intermittently as the flagship of Vizeadmiral (Vice Admiral) Robert Mischke, the commander of the Coastal Defense Division. Undine was transferred back to the Detached Division on 13 April 1915 to take part in an operation the next day to bombard Russian positions at Memel and Buddendiekshof; the attacks continued through 17 April, after which Undine returned to the Coastal Defense Division.

On 7 November 1915, Undine was steaming north of Arkona with a pair of torpedo boats as escort for the ferry Preussen as it moved from Trelleborg to Sassnitz. She was attacked by the British submarine E19, under the command of Lieutenant Commander Francis Cromie. E19 launched a pair of torpedoes at Undine at a range of 1,000 m (3,300 ft), both of which hit. The second torpedo detonated her ammunition magazines and blew up the ship. Undine broke in half and sank quickly at 13:08; the bow portion sank immediately but the stern section remained afloat briefly, jutting out of the water at a steep angle. Casualties were relatively minor, but the number is unclear: according to Erich Gröner, fourteen men were killed, but Hans Hildebrand, Albert Röhr, and Hans-Otto Steinmetz report that twenty-five died. The majority of her crew was rescued by the torpedo boat V154 and Preussen. Most of those who died were killed when the forward funnel and mast collapsed and fell over, crushing the men in the water. The loss of Undine came on the heels of the sinking of the armored cruiser Prinz Adalbert two weeks earlier. These two losses were significant enough to compel the German Navy to curtail the movements of the fleet in the Baltic for the remainder of the year.
