= Francis Cromie =

British Royal Navy officer

Francis Newton Allen Cromie
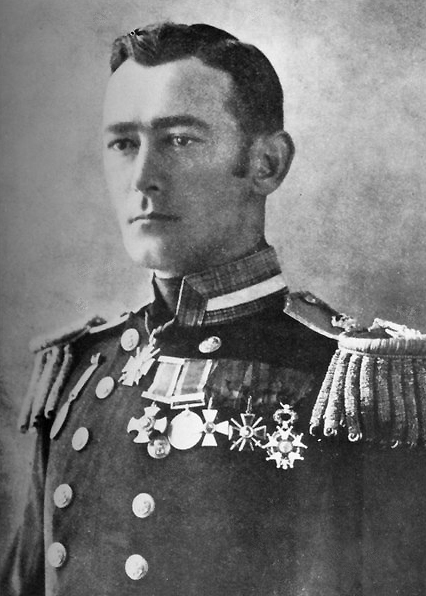
- Captain Francis Cromie
- Born: 30 January 1882; Duncannon, Ireland
- Died: 31 August 1918 (aged 36); Killed in the British Embassy, Petrograd, Russia
- Burial place: Smolensky Cemetery, Saint Petersburg, Russia
- Spouse(s): Gladys (Gwladys) Catherine Josephine (née Cromie, m. 1907-1920; remarried)
- Military career
- Allegiance: (United Kingdom) British Empire
- Branch: Royal Navy
- Service years: 1897-1918
- Rank: Captain (Acting); Commander; Naval attaché
- Commands: Depot Ship HMS Onyx and British Royal Navy Devenport submarine flotilla Depot Ship HMS Rosario and British Royal Navy China Hong Kong submarine flotilla British Royal Navy Baltic submarine flotilla HMS E19
- Conflicts: Seymour Expedition; World War I: British submarine flotilla in the Baltic
- Awards: Companion of the Order of the Bath; Distinguished Service Order; China War Medal (with Peking clasp); Order of St. George (4th Class); Order of St. Vladimir (4th Class with Swords); Order of St. Anna (2nd Class with Swords); Legion of Honour (Chevalier); Royal Humane Society (bronze medal)
- Memorials: Archangel Memorial in Arkhangelsk, Russia

Acting Captain Francis Newton Allen Cromie, CB, DSO (30 January 1882 – 31 August 1918, Petrograd) was a distinguished British Royal Navy officer, military diplomat, and the de facto chief of British Intelligence operations in northern Russia for the British Naval Intelligence Division. At the outbreak of World War I he was commanding officer of the British Royal Navy China Hong Kong submarine flotilla, and from 1915 assumed command of the British submarine flotilla in the Baltic. Later during the First World War and Russian Revolution he was naval attaché to the diplomatic staff of the British Embassy in Petrograd (Saint Petersburg), Russia, where he met his death, while defending the British embassy premises.

== Early life and naval career ==
Born in Duncannon, Ireland, he was the son of British army captain Francis Charles Cromie of the Hampshire Regiment (later Consul-General in Dakar, Senegal). His mother was the daughter of the Chief Constable of Pembrokeshire. He was educated at Haverfordwest Grammar School in Wales, and in 1897 joined the Royal Navy as a naval cadet at HMS Britannia; he joined HMS Repulse on passing out, and in 1900, as a midshipman of HMS Barfleur, took part in the Seymour Expedition to China, for which he received the China War Medal with Peking clasp.

=== Submarine Service ===
In 1901 he was promoted to Acting Sub-Lieutenant, two years later he was promoted to Lieutenant. In 1903, he volunteered to join the Royal Navy Submarine Service and was one of the first officers to command a submarine. In 1906, he was awarded the bronze Royal Humane Society medal for his efforts, while serving on submarine HMS A3 at Spithead, to save a sailor who was swept overboard. From 1911 to 1912 he commanded the depot ship HMS Onyx and a flotilla of submarines at Devonport, and in 1913-14 the depot ship HMS Rosario and the British China Hong Kong submarine flotilla.

In August 1915, he commissioned the submarine HMS E19; the following month, he forced a passage into the Baltic Sea to support the Russian Baltic Fleet, preying on iron ore transports from Sweden to the German Empire, where for a week he succeeded in entirely suspending German maritime traffic in the area. During his service in the Baltic, he torpedoed a German destroyer and on 7 November 1915 sank the German cruiser Undine, as well as sinking or capturing 10 German steamships. On 31 December 1915 he was promoted to the British Royal Navy rank of Commander.

=== Service distinction ===
On 31 May 1916 he received the British Empire Distinguished Service Order (DSO), followed by a succession of imperial Russian orders; Order of St. Anna (2nd Class with Swords), Order of St. Vladimir (4th Class with Swords), Order of St. George (4th Class), as well as the French National Order of the Legion of Honour (Chevalier).

== Diplomatic service in revolutionary Petrograd ==
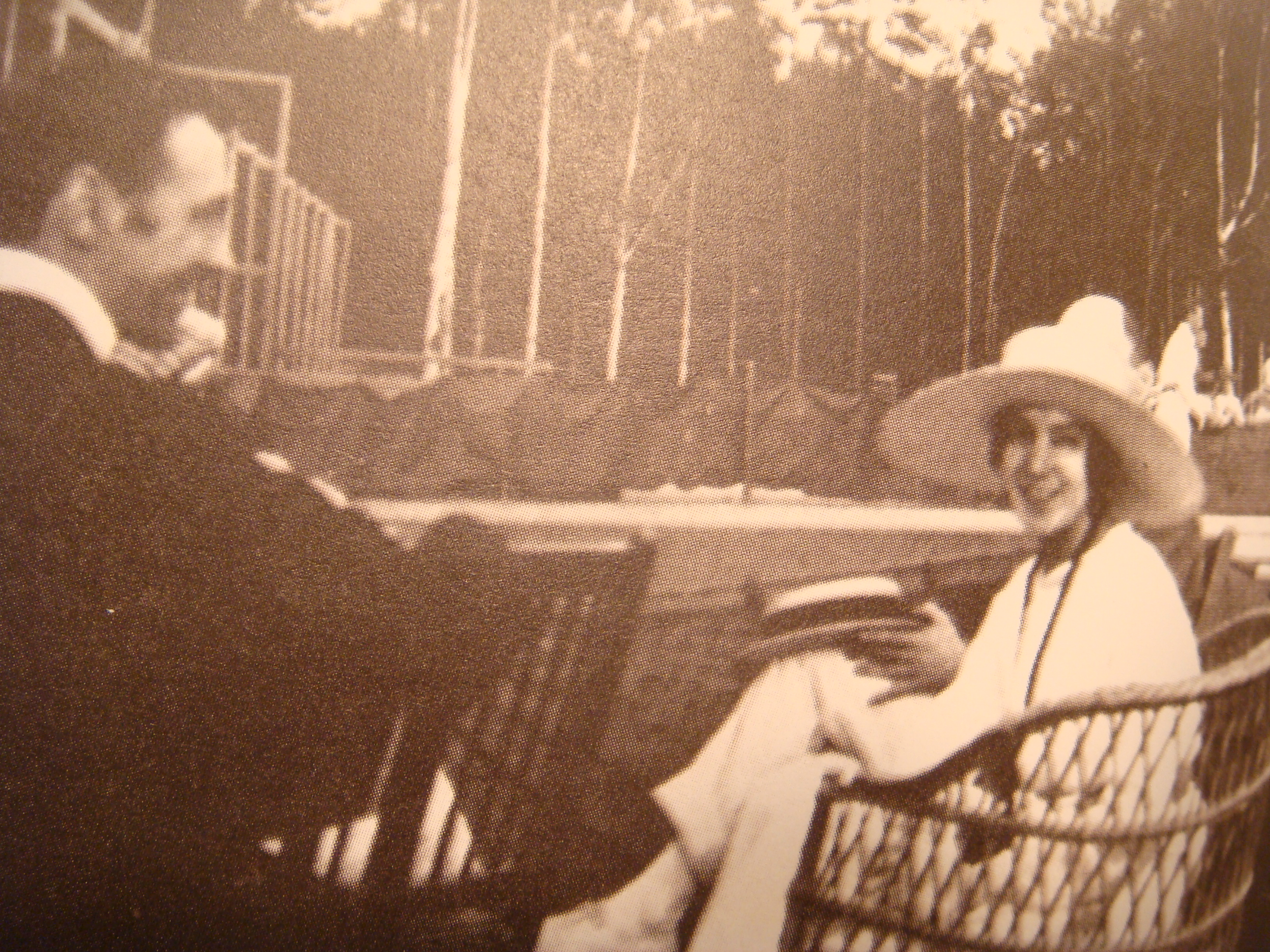
British naval attaché Captain Cromie, socialising at a tennis club in Petrograd, 1918.

Together with his knowledge of the Russian language and prevailing conditions, on 19 October 1917 he was promoted Acting Captain and appointed as naval attaché to the British Embassy in the tense revolutionary city of Petrograd (Saint Petersburg), Russia. Highly respected among Russia's elite, his diplomatic tact, during the Russian Revolution, earned him much respect from the extremists for his fairness. In April 1918, after the Germans had secured control over the Baltic coast, he was responsible for the evacuation and scuttling of the British Baltic submarines.

=== Death defending the British embassy in Petrograd ===
Prior to the embassy incident that resulted his death, Moscow authorities claimed to have received a report suggesting a connection between various counter-revolutionary organizations in the British government and the embassy in Petrograd, and the Bolshevik-government commissioner M. Hillier had been instructed to investigate this report. It had been supposed that the anti-Bolshevik counter-revolutionists Boris Savinkov and Maximilian Filonenko, who had contacts with British Secret Intelligence Service agents, were being aided and hiding in the British embassy. Other accounts and sources, however, reveal that meetings with other Russian members of the counter-revolution were at that time taking place, namely with the former imperial Tsarist officers Lieutenant Sabir and Colonel Steckelmann.

On 31 August 1918, commissioner Hillier and a detachment of Cheka "scouts", the Bolshevik secret police, went to the British embassy in Petrograd. On entering the building, shouting in Russian and crashing doors, which echoed up from the embassy ground floor where staff were working, Captain Cromie glanced out from his office's first floor window, saw trucks and, over on the Neva river, patrol boats facing the embassy building with weapons trained. Clearly expecting trouble, he pulled out his revolver, and leaving a meeting with three operatives in his office, went out into the first floor hallway passage. Other accounts and sources, however, reveal Captain Cromie was having tea with the British chaplain, Mr. Lombard, and he had stepped out of the room to return in a short moment. Some Cheka scouts were now also proceeding up onto the embassy first floor, panic and protests broke out, and they were met with gunfire. One Cheka scout was killed and another wounded. According to the Cheka scouts' report of events and a dispatch received from Moscow quoting Russia's political newspaper Pravda; a fight had ensued in the corridor and the Cheka scouts were obliged to return gunfire. During the ferocious embassy shootout, naval attaché Captain Cromie, received a fatal gunshot or gunshots, and eventually died where he fell, on the grand embassy staircase. Cheka scouts continued searching the embassy building, and with their rifle butts repelled embassy staff from getting close to the corpse of Captain Cromie, which the Cheka had looted and trampled. The police then entered the British embassy, and 40 embassy persons were arrested, mostly British subjects, including Prince Schaschowsky. It was alleged that weapons and compromising documents were found on the embassy premises.

British Foreign Office advices? declared that attaché Captain Cromie opposed the Bolshevik troops and killed three soldiers with his own hands. Cromie was killed and his corpse mutilated. Documents at the embassy were destroyed. It was feared similar outrages would be committed against the French embassy in Petrograd and that precautionary measures had been taken including the arrival of French soldiers, the Foreign Office said.

On 3 September 1918, American Consul Haynes (the first American Consul of career?) at Helsinki in Finland, officially reported the murder of Captain Cromie and the attack on the British embassy to the United States Department of State, that the entirety of British embassy personnel in Petrograd had been arrested, and similar arrests had simultaneously taken place in Moscow.

=== British outrage at embassy attack and killing ===
The embassy attack and killing of naval attaché Captain Cromie was reported with intense indignation by the British news media. The British media channelled outrage at the Bolsheviks' "lawlessness", acts committed against British subjects, and the murder of Captain Cromie, prompting reprisals. In London, the Bolshevik representative Maxim Litvinov and his staff had been placed by the British government "under preventive arrest" and taken to Brixton Prison "until all British representatives in Bolshevik Russia had been set at liberty and allowed to proceed to the Finnish border unmolested." Following events, the British embassy was subsequently shut down, and the embassy staff were withdrawn from service in Petrograd.

=== Witness recollection of events ===
A firsthand recount, published in 1934 by Mary Britnieva, a Red Cross nurse who had served on the Eastern Front, recounts the events witnessed by her sister-in-law, who was in the British embassy at the time of the attack:

"My sister in law ran out into the hallway and as she emerged she saw Captain Cromie running down the steps two at a time, straight towards her. Behind him at the top of the stairs, stood a man firing at the Captain. Several bullets whizzed by her head and crashed through the glass of the entrance doors behind her. Her horror seemed to root her to the spot and suddenly, just as Captain Cromie reached the last stair, he pitched forward as if he had stumbled, staggered a little and then crashed down backwards with his head on the bottom step. My sister in law ran to him and lifted his head. He was moving his eyelids and she felt something warm trickling down the fingers of her right hand with which she was holding up his head from underneath. Suddenly a terrific blow made her drop Captain Cromie's head and sent her spinning against the right hand wall. The man who had struck her grabbed her and ran her up the stairs hitting her violently from time to time and finally pushing her into the Chancery room where she found all of the members of the Embassy and the Consulate standing with hands raised above their heads. After being searched for arms, the Embassy staff were forced to hand over their papers and then marched downstairs and on to the street."

== Marriage ==
Francis Cromie married Gladys (Gwladys) Catherine Josephine (née Cromie) March 1907, in Portsmouth, Hampshire, England. They had one daughter, Dolores Anthea, born June 1907, in Fareham, Hampshire, England. His widow, Gladys (Gwladys) Catherine Josephine, remarried in June 1920.

== Posthumous award ==
On 17 September 1918 Captain Francis Cromie was posthumously awarded the Companion of the Order of the Bath (CB) "in recognition of his distinguished service in the Allied cause in Russia, and of the devotion to duty which he displayed in remaining at his post as British Naval Attaché in Russia, when the British Embassy was withdrawn. This devotion to duty cost him his life." King George V received Capt. Cromie's widow Gladys (Gwladys) Catherine Cromie at Buckingham Palace, and handed to her the CB.

He remains the only naval attaché to be killed in combat.

== Burial ==
Captain Cromie's body was first taken to the Bolshevik Smolny Institute, and later released to the British Chaplaincy. Covered with the Union flag, his body was finally buried in Smolensky Cemetery, Saint Petersburg, by the Scottish minister Dr. Kean. A memorial in Captain Cromie's memory was laid at the Commonwealth War Graves Commission Archangel Memorial (Archangel Allied Cemetery), in Arkhangelsk, Russia.

== Dramatic representations ==
Captain Cromie was portrayed by actor Barry Stokes in two episodes of popular 1983 drama Reilly, Ace of Spies, in which he is depicted as aiding British agents Sidney Reilly and George Alexander Hill, culminating in his defence of the embassy.

== Literature ==
- Hoare, Sir Samuel (1930). "XIII. A BRITISH AND A RUSSIAN HERO - CROMIE". The Fourth Seal. London: William Heinemann Limited. pp. 277–296.
- O'Moore, Creagh; Humphris, Edith (1926). The V.C. AND D.S.O.; A complete record of all those officers, non-commissioned officers and men of His Majesty's naval, military and air forces who have been awarded these decorations from the time of their institution, with descriptions of the deeds and services which won the distinctions and with many biographical and other details, compiled from official publications and despatches, letters from commanding officers and other contemporary accounts, and from information from private sources. Vol. III. London: The Standard Art Book Co. Ltd. p. 230.
- Britnieva, Mary (1934). One Woman's Story. London: Arthur Baker Limited.
- Bainton, Roy (2002). Honored by Strangers: The Life of Captain Francis Cromie, Dso, RN, 1882-1918. Shrewsbury: Airlife Publishing, Ltd. ISBN 978-1-84037-196-3.
- Ferguson, Harry (2010). Operation Kronstadt: The True Story of Honour, Espionage, and the Rescue of Britain's Greatest Spy The Man with a Hundred Faces. London: Arrow Books. ISBN 978-0-09-951465-7.
- West, Nigel (2010). Historical Dictionary of Naval Intelligence. Lanham, Maryland, US: Scarecrow Press, Inc. pp. 73–74. ISBN 978-0-8108-6760-4.
