= SMS Prinz Adalbert =

Three ships of the Imperial German Navy have been named SMS Prinz Adalbert:

- SMS Prinz Adalbert (1865), an ironclad ram originally ordered for the Confederate States Navy
- SMS Prinz Adalbert (1876), a corvette that served in the German overseas colonial empire
- SMS Prinz Adalbert (1901), an armored cruiser sunk by a British submarine in World War I

== See also ==
- Prinz Adalbert-class cruiser
- SS Prinz Adalbert
