= HMS E9 =

Submarine of the Royal Navy

- HMS E9

History

United Kingdom
- Name: E9
- Builder: Vickers, Barrow
- Laid down: 1 June 1912
- Launched: 29 November 1913
- Commissioned: 18 June 1914
- Fate: Scuttled, 3 April 1918

General characteristics
- Class & type: E-class submarine
- Displacement: 667 long tons (678 t) surfaced; 807 long tons (820 t) submerged
- Length: 181 ft (55 m)
- Beam: 15 ft (4.6 m)
- Propulsion: 2 × 800 hp (597 kW) diesels; 2 × 420 hp (313 kW) electric; 2 propellers
- Speed: 15.25 knots (28.24 km/h; 17.55 mph) surfaced; 10.25 knots (18.98 km/h; 11.80 mph) submerged
- Range: 3,000 nmi (5,600 km) at 10 kn (19 km/h; 12 mph); 65 nmi (120 km) at 5 kn (9.3 km/h; 5.8 mph)
- Complement: 30
- Armament: 5 × 18 inch (450 mm) torpedo tubes (2 bow, 2 beam, 1 stern)

HMS E9 was a British E class submarine built by Vickers, Barrow. She was laid down on 1 June 1912 and was commissioned on 18 June 1914.

== Design ==
Like all post-E8 British E-class submarines, E9 had a displacement of 662 long tons (673 t) at the surface and 807 long tons (820 t) while submerged. She had a total length of 180 feet (55 m) and a beam of 22 feet 8.5 inches (6.922 m). She was powered by two 800 horsepower (600 kW) Vickers eight-cylinder two-stroke diesel engines and two 420 horsepower (310 kW) electric motors. The submarine had a maximum surface speed of 16 knots (30 km/h; 18 mph) and a submerged speed of 10 knots (19 km/h; 12 mph). British E-class submarines had fuel capacities of 50 long tons (51 t) of diesel and ranges of 3,255 miles (5,238 km; 2,829 nmi) when travelling at 10 knots (19 km/h; 12 mph). E9 was capable of operating submerged for five hours when travelling at 5 knots (9.3 km/h; 5.8 mph).

E9 was not fitted with a deck gun during construction, and it is not known whether one was fitted later, as was the case with many boats up to E19. She was the first of her class to be constructed with five 18 inch (450 mm) torpedo tubes, two in the bow, one either side amidships, and one in the stern; a total of 10 torpedoes were carried.

E-Class submarines had wireless systems with 1 kilowatt (1.3 hp) power ratings; in some submarines, these were later upgraded to 3 kilowatts (4.0 hp) systems by removing a midship torpedo tube. Their maximum design depth was 100 feet (30 m) although in service some reached depths of below 200 feet (61 m). Some submarines contained Fessenden oscillator systems.

== Crew ==
Her complement was three officers and 28 men.

== Service history ==
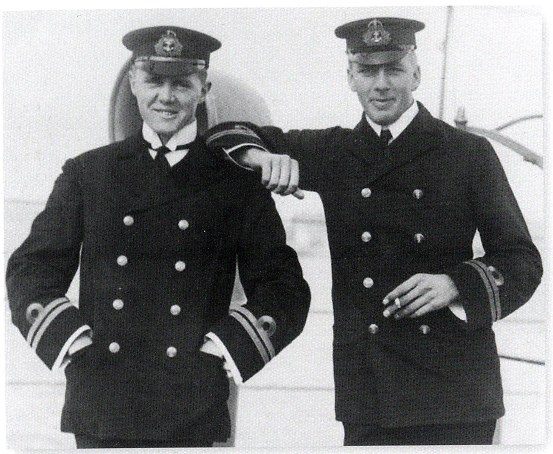
Horton (left) with Noel F. Laurence, commander of HMS E1 (right), while serving in the Baltic

When war was declared with Germany on 5 August 1914, E9 was based at Harwich, in the 8th Submarine Flotilla of the Home Fleets.

At dawn on 13 September 1914, the submarine, commanded by Lieutenant-Commander Horton, torpedoed the German light cruiser SMS Hela six miles southwest of Heligoland. Hela was hit amidships with the two torpedoes, fired from a range of 600 yards. All but two of her crew were rescued by the German submarine U-18 and another German ship. Although pursued most of the day by German naval forces, E9 managed to reach Harwich safely. Three weeks later, Horton sank the German destroyer S116 off the mouth of the River Ems. For sinking the cruiser and the destroyer, Horton was awarded the Distinguished Service Order (DSO).

On 15 October 1914, E9 set out for the Baltic to act in support of the Russians, together with E1, and followed later by E11. Due to technical problems, E1 reached Libau before E9. E11 was forced to turn back. The transit through the Sound was particularly hazardous.

On 2 July 1915 E9 torpedoed SMS Prinz Adalbert. The torpedo hit below the conning tower, caused severe damage, and killed ten men, but failed to sink the ship.

During 18 and 19 October 1915, E9 successively intercepted four German steamers. Following cruiser rules, the ships were stopped and three of them were sunk. The fourth, which was carrying a cargo of wood, failed to sink.

E9 was scuttled outside Helsinki (Helsingfors) 1.5 nautical miles (2.8 km; 1.7 mi) off Grohara Light in the Gulf of Finland on 3 April 1918 to avoid seizure by advancing German forces.

HMS E9 was salvaged for breaking in Finland in August 1953.

== The Jolly Roger Tradition ==
While in command of the E9, Horton initiated the tradition of submarines flying the Jolly Roger upon returning from successful combat patrols. Remembering comments by First Sea Lord Admiral Sir Arthur Wilson, who complained that submarines were "underhanded, unfair, and damned un-English" and that personnel should be hanged as pirates, Horton flew the flag when the E9 returned to port following the sinking of the Hela. They flew additional flags after each successful patrol, but when there was no room for more flags, they began adding symbols, each indicating a certain achievement, to a single large flag. This practice was imitated by other British submarines during World War I, and it was renewed again during World War II. The Admiralty initially disapproved of the practice, but was unable to stop it. The Jolly Roger has since been adopted as the logo of the Royal Navy Submarine Service.
