= HMS C27 =

Submarine of the Royal Navy

History

United Kingdom
- Name: HMS C27
- Builder: Vickers, Barrow
- Laid down: 4 June 1908
- Launched: 22 April 1909
- Commissioned: 14 August 1909
- Fate: Scuttled, 5 April 1918, salvaged and scrapped August 1953

General characteristics
- Class & type: C-class submarine
- Displacement: 290 long tons (290 t) surfaced; 320 long tons (330 t) submerged
- Length: 142 ft 3 in (43.4 m)
- Beam: 13 ft 7 in (4.1 m)
- Draught: 11 ft 6 in (3.5 m)
- Installed power: 600 bhp (450 kW) petrol; 300 hp (220 kW) electric
- Propulsion: 1 × 16-cylinder Vickers petrol engine; 1 × electric motor
- Speed: 13 kn (24 km/h; 15 mph) surfaced; 8 kn (15 km/h; 9.2 mph) submerged
- Range: 910 nmi (1,690 km; 1,050 mi) at 12 kn (22 km/h; 14 mph) on the surface
- Test depth: 100 feet (30.5 m)
- Complement: 2 officers and 14 ratings
- Armament: 2 × 18 in (450 mm) bow torpedo tubes

HMS C27 was one of 38 C-class submarines built for the Royal Navy in the first decade of the 20th century.

== Design and description ==
The C-class boats of the 1907–08 and subsequent Naval Programmes were modified to improve their speed, both above and below the surface. The submarine had a length of 142 feet 3 inches (43.4 m) overall, a beam of 13 feet 7 inches (4.1 m) and a mean draught of 11 feet 6 inches (3.5 m). They displaced 290 long tons (290 t) on the surface and 320 long tons (330 t) submerged. The C-class submarines had a crew of two officers and fourteen ratings.

For surface running, the boats were powered by a single 12-cylinder 600-brake-horsepower (447 kW) Vickers petrol engine that drove one propeller shaft. When submerged the propeller was driven by a 300-horsepower (224 kW) electric motor. They could reach 13 knots (24 km/h; 15 mph) on the surface and 8 knots (15 km/h; 9.2 mph) underwater. On the surface, the C class had a range of 910 nautical miles (1,690 km; 1,050 mi) at 12 knots (22 km/h; 14 mph).

The boats were armed with two 18-inch (45 cm) torpedo tubes in the bow. They could carry a pair of reload torpedoes, but generally did not as they would have to remove an equal weight of fuel in compensation.

== Construction and career ==
HMS C27 was built by Vickers, Barrow. She was laid down on 4 June 1908 and was commissioned on 14 August 1909. HMS C27 along with the trawler Princess Louise (ex-Princess Marie Jose) sank U-23 in the Fair Isle Channel between Orkney and Shetland on 20 July 1915 using the U-boat trap tactic. The tactic was to use a decoy trawler to tow a submarine. When a U-boat was sighted, the tow line and communication line was slipped and the submarine would attack the U-boat. The tactic was partly successful, but was abandoned after the loss of two C class submarines. In both cases, all the crew were lost.

HMS C27 was involved in the Baltic operations from 1915 to 1918. The boat was scuttled on 5 April 1918 outside Helsingfors (Helsinki) south of the Harmaja Light (Gråhara) to avoid seizure by advancing German forces. HMS C27 was salvaged for breaking up in Finland in August 1953.
