= Hugh Marrack =

Rear-Admiral Hugh Marrack CBE DSC ADC
- Born: 5 June 1888; Walton in Gordano, Somerset
- Died: 12 February 1972 (aged 83); Royal Naval Hospital Haslar, Gosport
- Relatives: John Marrack (brother)
- Military career
- Allegiance: United Kingdom
- Branch: Royal Navy
- Service years: 1908–1945
- Rank: Rear-Admiral
- Commands: HMS A9; HMS A10; HMS C19; HMS E51; HMS L71; HMS K8; HMS M3; HMS Fermoy; HMAS Oxley; 6th Submarine Flotilla; 4th Submarine Flotilla; HMS Carlisle
- Conflicts: World War I; World War II
- Awards: Distinguished Service Cross; Commander of the Order of the British Empire

Hugh Richard Marrack (5 July 1888 – 12 February 1972) was a submarine specialist serving in the British Royal Navy, who commanded both the Portland and China Submarine flotillas and was Commodore Superintendent, Gibraltar, 1943–45. Marrack later became an ADC to King George VI.

== Early life ==
Hugh Marrack was born in Walton in Gordano, Somerset, the fourth child of John Reed Marrack and his wife Mary (nee Saunders). He was educated at Blundell's School in Tiverton, before joining the Royal Navy as a cadet on 15 January 1903, being trained aboard HMS Britannia.

== Service biography ==
Marrack was promoted to midshipman on 15 July 1904, and on 20 May 1908 Acting Sub-lieutenant Marrack was confirmed in his rank with seniority from 15 October 1907. After serving for a short time aboard the battleship HMS Jupiter, Marrack joined the Submarine Branch of the Royal Navy, and on 15 August 1908 was appointed to the submarine depot ship HMS Mercury at Portsmouth 'for Instruction in Submarine Boats'. In August 1909 he was transferred to the submarine depot ship HMS Bonaventure at Queenstown 'for Submarines'. Marrack was promoted to lieutenant on 30 June 1910.

On 26 October 1911 Marrack was appointed to HMS Onyx at Devonport to take command of the submarine HMS A9, then serving as commander of HMS A10 into 1912. On 15 August 1912 he was appointed to submarine tender HMS Vulcan at Dundee to command HMS C19. Marrack remained in command of C19 after the outbreak of World War I, based at various ports, until 1 December 1916 when he was appointed to HMS Maidstone at Harwich to command HMS E51. In mid-April 1918 Marrack was awarded the Distinguished Service Cross, and was promoted to lieutenant commander on 30 June 1918.

After the armistice in November 1918 Marrack remained in command of E51 going to then command the submarines HMS L71, HMS K8 and HMS M3. On 14 April 1923 he was appointed to command of HMS Fermoy, the depot ship of the Periscope School at Portland, and on 30 June was promoted to commander.

Marrack was 'loaned' to the Royal Australian Navy on 1 April 1927 to command the submarine HMAS Oxley, until 5 September 1928. On 26 March 1929 he was appointed to command of the submarine depot ship HMS Vulcan and the 6th Submarine Flotilla at Portsmouth, moving his command to the depot ship HMS Titania on 1 October 1930, and being promoted to captain on 31 December 1930.

On 2 February 1931 Marrack was appointed to command of the submarine depot ship HMS Medway and of the 4th Submarine Flotilla on the China Station. From 5 May to 3 June 1933 Marrack was commodore-in-charge of naval establishments at Hong Kong (HMS Tamar) with the temporary rank of commodore, 2nd class.

He then returned to England to attend the senior officers' war course at the RN War College, Greenwich, as well as the tactical course, at HM Dockyard, Portsmouth (HMS Victory), before being appointed to command of the light cruiser HMS Carlisle on 5 September 1934, as part of the 6th Cruiser Squadron under the Commander-in-Chief, Africa, Vice Admiral Edward Evans, serving until mid-1937 when his ship returned to England to refit.

Marrack then served as captain superintendent of HM Dockyard Sheerness, and, from 12 December 1939, as commodore-in-charge, until 15 January 1941 when he was promoted to rear admiral and the following day placed on the Retired List. However, despite this Marrack remained in active service, being made a Commander of the Order of the British Empire in the Birthday Honours of 2 June 1943, and serving as Commodore Superintendent at Gibraltar Dockyard from 1943 until the end of the war in 1945.

== Personal life ==
Marrack married Christine Banbury Pilkington (nee Hallett) at the Old Parish Church in Upper Dovercourt on 7 July 1917. Christine Pilkington was the widow of Lieutenant George Pilkington who died when HMS C31 was lost on 7 January 1915. They had no children.

Rear Admiral Marrack died in the Royal Naval Hospital at Haslar on 12 February 1972.

== Papers ==
The Imperial War Museum in London holds the papers of Rear Admiral Hugh Marrack 1932–1937 (ref: 72/52/1), including his account of the seizure of the Chinese quarter of Shanghai by the Chinese Nationalist Army led by General Chiang Kai-shek in April 1927 (written 1932); an account of his service as commanding officer, HMS Carlisle, Africa Station 1934–1937; an account of a visit of Carlisle to Tristan da Cunha in 1937; and two files of papers relating to submarines.
