= Marrack =

Marrack is a surname. Notable people with the surname include:

- Marrack Goulding KCMG (1936–2010), British diplomat who served more than eleven years as Under-Secretary-General of the United Nations
- Abi Marrack of Echo Beach (TV series), British teen drama series that aired on ITV in 2008
- Hugh Marrack, CBE, DSC (1888–1972), submarine specialist in the Royal Navy, Commodore Superintendent, Gibraltar, 1943–45
- John Marrack, DSO, MC (1886–1976), the Emeritus Professor of Chemical Pathology in the University of London
- Philippa Marrack FRS is an English biologist, based in the United States

== See also ==
- Marac
- Marak (disambiguation)
