= HMS Lurcher (1912) =

Destroyer of the Royal Navy

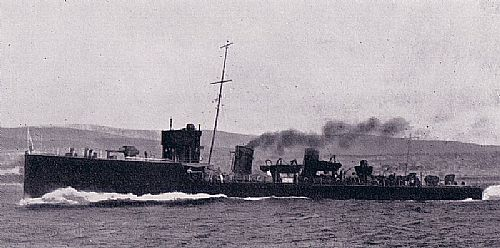
- HMS Lurcher

History

United Kingdom
- Name: HMS Lurcher
- Builder: Yarrow & Company, Scotstoun, Glasgow
- Yard number: 1305
- Launched: 1 June 1912
- Fate: Sold for scrapping, 9 June 1922

General characteristics
- Class & type: Acheron-class destroyer
- Displacement: 990 tons
- Length: 75 m (246 ft 1 in)
- Beam: 7.8 m (25 ft 7 in)
- Draught: 2.7 m (8 ft 10 in)
- Installed power: 20,000 shp (15,000 kW)
- Propulsion: 2 × Parsons turbines; 3 × Yarrow oil-fired boilers; 2 × shafts
- Speed: 35 knots (65 km/h)
- Complement: 70
- Armament: 2 × BL 4-inch (101.6 mm) L/40 Mark VIII guns, mounting P Mark V; 2 × QF 12 pounder 12 cwt naval gun, mounting P Mark I; 2 × single tubes for 21 inch (533 mm) torpedoes

HMS Lurcher was a modified Acheron-class destroyer, named after the lurcher-type dog, and the fifth ship of the Royal Navy to bear the name; when new she was the fastest ship in the Royal Navy.

== Pennant numbers ==
Pennant number	From	To
H01	6 December 1914	1 January 1918
H65	1 January 1918	Early 1919
H90	Early 1919	10 October 1921

== Construction ==
Sir Alfred Yarrow maintained that it was possible to build strong, seaworthy destroyers with a speed of 32 knots (59 km/h; 37 mph), and a contract for three such boats was placed with Yarrow & Company of Scotstoun, Glasgow. The "Firedrake Specials", "Special I class" or "Yarrow Specials" were a little larger than the rest of the class but carried the same armament. Lurcher, Firedrake and Oak were, however, distinctive in appearance and at least 4 knots (7.4 km/h; 4.6 mph) faster than the rest of their class. They all exceeded their contract speed, Lurcher making over 35 knots (65 km/h; 40 mph); she became part of the 1st Destroyer Flotilla.

== World War I ==
At the start of World War I Lurcher and Firedrake were assigned to the 8th Submarine Flotilla under the command of Commodore Roger Keyes, and were based at Parkeston Quay, Harwich. Both ships were employed in escorting, towing and exercising with submarines of their flotilla, and the more notable episodes are detailed below:

=== The Battle of Heligoland Bight ===
On 26 August 1914 Keyes hoisted his broad pennant in Lurcher, leading Firedrake, two D-class and six E-class submarines eastwards into the North Sea. Also at sea were the destroyers of Commodore Reginald Tyrwhitt. The plan was to place elements of the High Seas Fleet between Royal Navy surface ships and bottomed Royal Navy submarines. Unknown to Keyes and Tyrwhitt, the Admiralty had added significant reinforcements at the last minute.

Keyes' despatch reads:

At midnight on the 26th August, I embarked in the Lurcher, and, in company with Firedrake and Submarines D2, D8, E4, E5, E6, E7, E8 and E9 of the Eighth Submarine Flotilla, proceeded to take part in the operations in the Heligoland bight arranged for the 28th August. the Destroyers scouted for submarines until nightfall on the 27th, when the latter proceeded independently to take up various positions from which they could co-operate with the Destroyer Flotillas on the following morning. At Daylight on the 28th August, the Lurcher and Firedrake searched the area through which the Battle Cruisers were to advance for hostile Submarines, and then proceeded towards Heligoland in the wake of Submarines E6, E7 and E8, which were exposing themselves with the object of inducing the enemy to chase them to the westward.

Battle was joined at 7:00 on 28 August in misty conditions. Due to lack of information about reinforcements sent by the Admiralty, great potential existed for fratricidal attacks; at 8:15 am Firedrake and Lurcher came close to attacking the cruisers Lowestoft and Nottingham.

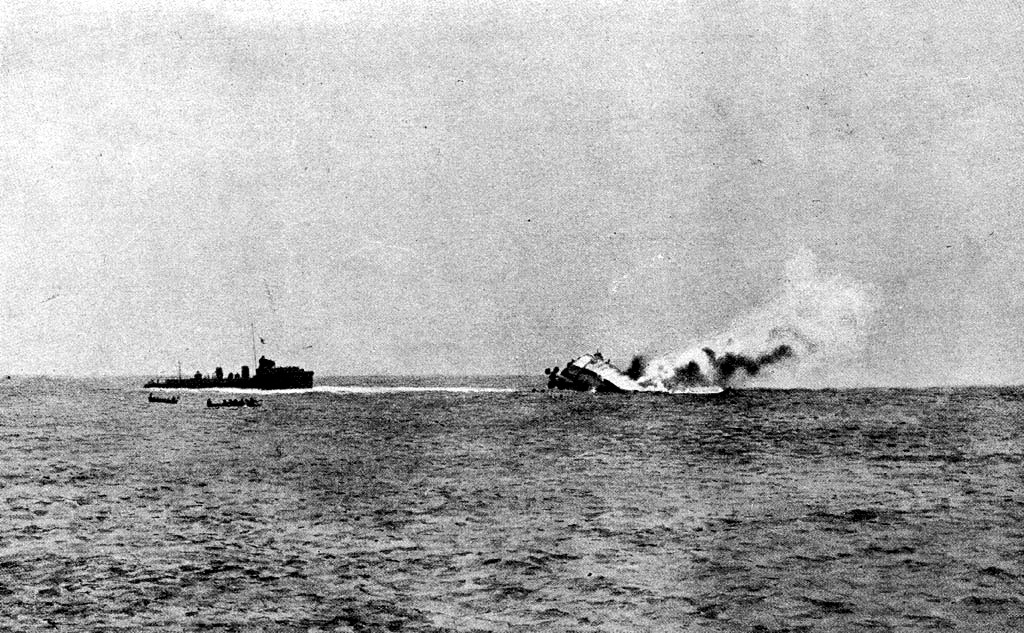
SMS Mainz sinking, with Lurcher and boats of Liverpool to the left of the picture

After the German cruiser SMS Mainz was heavily damaged and disabled, Commodore Goodenough ordered his ships to cease firing on her at 12:55 pm and a rescue operation was undertaken. Liverpool, accompanied by Lurcher and Firedrake, manoeuvred close to Mainz in an effort to recover the surviving crew. Boats from Liverpool were deployed to retrieve those who had abandoned ship while Lurcher positioned alongside Mainz to transfer the crew who remained on board. By 1:10pm the Royal Navy ships withdrew as the height of tide was high enough to allow larger German Navy units to enter the area. Although the operation had been something of a shambles in the mist, the results were clear: Three German light cruisers and a destroyer sunk against no Royal Navy losses.

=== Submarines in the Baltic ===
On 22 September 1914 Firedrake and Lurcher towed the submarines E1 and E5 towards the Skagerrak. This was the first act in a long saga that culminated in a British submarine flotilla in the Baltic.

=== Raid on Scarborough ===
By 14 December 1914 the Admiralty had advance warning of the intended raid on Scarborough, Hartlepool and Whitby through signals intelligence. Commodore Keyes was ordered to send eight submarines and his two command destroyers, Firedrake and Lurcher, to take stations off the island of Terschelling to catch the German ships should they turn west into the English Channel. On 16 December, as the situation developed, the submarines were ordered to move to the Heligoland Bight in order to intercept returning German ships. They failed, although one torpedo was fired at SMS Posen by E11, which missed. As a last-ditch attempt to catch Rear Admiral Franz Hipper, the Admiralty ordered Keyes to take his two destroyers and attempt to torpedo Hipper as he returned home around 2 am. on 17 December. Keyes himself had considered this and wanted to try, but the message was delayed and failed to reach him until too late.

=== Search for HM Submarine C31 ===
On 7 January 1915 both Lurcher and Firedrake carried out a search for the missing submarine C31, to little avail; it transpired later that she had been mined off the Belgian coast on 4 January.

=== Battle of Jutland ===
Lurcher sailed from Harwich on 30 May in company with HM Submarines E31, E53 and D6 to patrol positions between Southwold and the Dutch coast, but were not involved in the Battle of Jutland, which occurred further to the east.

=== Collision with HM Submarine C17 ===
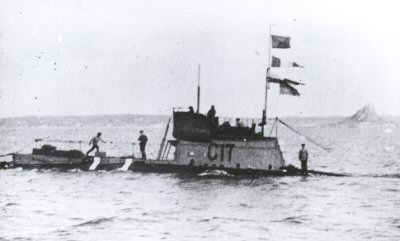
HMS C17

In May 1917 Lurcher collided with and sank C17, which was later repaired and returned to service.

=== Rescue of HM Submarine C25 ===
At about noon on 6 July 1918 a squadron of five German seaplanes returning from a daylight raid on Lowestoft and Walmer came across C25 on the surface 15 miles (24 km) east of Orford Ness. Their machine-gun attack killed the commanding officer and four other men, as well as mortally wounding the coxswain. The steering gear, compasses and radio were all damaged. The first lieutenant, Sub Lieutenant Cobb, attracted the attention of E51 at about 12:45, and a tow was established. The seaplanes carried out further attacks on both submarines between 3:18 and 3:45 pm, and it was not until the arrival of Lurcher that the enemy seaplanes were driven off.

== Disposal ==
Lurcher survived the war and was sold to J. Cashmore of Newport for breaking on 9 June 1921.

== Commanding officers ==
From	To	Captain
29 October 1912	13 December 1913	Commander Claude Lionel Cumberlege RN
1914	1915	Commander Wilfred Tomkinson RN
