= C19 =

C19 or C-19 may refer to:

== Transportation ==
- HMS Birmingham (C19), a member of the first group of five ships of the British Town-class light cruisers
- C-19 Alpha, designation of 3 modified Northrop Alpha Type 2 aircraft purchased by the US Army Air Corps in 1931
- Boeing C-19, a military designation for the Boeing 747-100 series of aircraft
- Cierva C.19, a 1929 autogyro built in England
- HMS C19, a 1909 British C-class submarine
- Rio Grande class C-19, a narrow-gauge 2-8-0 locomotive
- Sauber C19, a 2000 racing car

== Other uses ==
- 19th century
- Iceberg C-19, an iceberg that broke off the Ross Ice Shelf in 2002 and which broke into two parts, C-19A ("Melting Bob") and C-19B, in 2003
- Caldwell 19 (IC 5146, the Cocoon Nebula), a reflection/emission nebula in the constellation Cygnus
- Carbon-19 (C-19 or ^{19}C), an isotope of carbon
- IEC 60320 C19, an electrical power connector
- French Defence (Encyclopaedia of Chess Openings code)
- Malignant neoplasm of rectosigmoid junction (ICD-10 code); See Colorectal cancer
- Colt Canada C19 standard issue bolt-action rifle of the Canadian Rangers
- COVID-19, a contagious disease
  - COVID-19 pandemic
- C19: The Society of Nineteenth-Century Americanists, an academic organization
