= HMS C25 =

Submarine of the Royal Navy

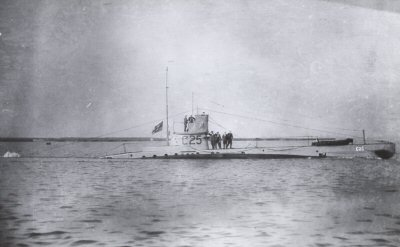
- HMS C25

History

United Kingdom
- Name: HMS C25
- Builder: Vickers, Barrow
- Laid down: 27 February 1908
- Launched: 10 March 1909
- Commissioned: 28 May 1909
- Fate: Sold, 5 December 1921

General characteristics
- Class & type: C-class submarine
- Displacement: 290 long tons (290 t) surfaced; 320 long tons (330 t) submerged
- Length: 142 ft 3 in (43.4 m)
- Beam: 13 ft 7 in (4.1 m)
- Draught: 11 ft 6 in (3.5 m)
- Installed power: 600 bhp (450 kW) petrol; 300 hp (220 kW) electric
- Propulsion: 1 × 16-cylinder Vickers petrol engine; 1 × electric motor
- Speed: 13 kn (24 km/h; 15 mph) surfaced; 8 kn (15 km/h; 9.2 mph) submerged
- Range: 910 nmi (1,690 km; 1,050 mi) at 12 kn (22 km/h; 14 mph) on the surface
- Test depth: 100 feet (30.5 m)
- Complement: 2 officers and 14 ratings
- Armament: 2 × 18 in (450 mm) bow torpedo tubes

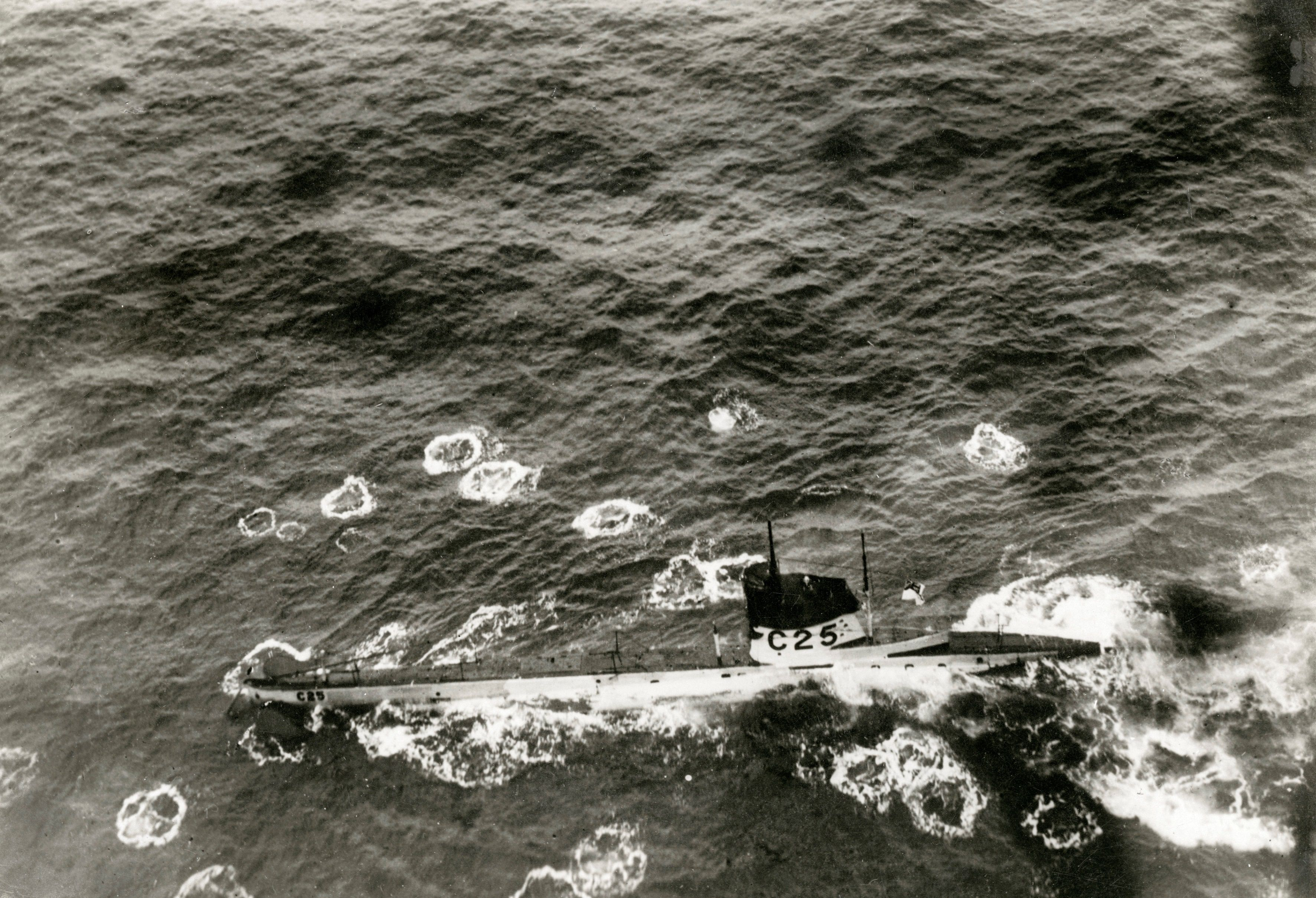
C25 under attack by German seaplanes on 6 July 1918.

HMS C25 was one of 38 C-class submarines built for the Royal Navy in the first decade of the 20th century. The boat survived the First World War and was sold for scrap in 1921.

== Design and description ==
The C-class boats of the 1907–08 and subsequent Naval Programmes were modified to improve their speed, both above and below the surface. The submarine had a length of 142 feet 3 inches (43.4 m) overall, a beam of 13 feet 7 inches (4.1 m) and a mean draught of 11 feet 6 inches (3.5 m). They displaced 290 long tons (290 t) on the surface and 320 long tons (330 t) submerged. The C-class submarines had a crew of two officers and fourteen ratings.

For surface running, the boats were powered by a single 12-cylinder 600-brake-horsepower (447 kW) Vickers petrol engine that drove one propeller shaft. When submerged the propeller was driven by a 300-horsepower (224 kW) electric motor. They could reach 13 knots (24 km/h; 15 mph) on the surface and 8 knots (15 km/h; 9.2 mph) underwater. On the surface, the C class had a range of 910 nautical miles (1,690 km; 1,050 mi) at 12 knots (22 km/h; 14 mph).

The boats were armed with two 18-inch (45 cm) torpedo tubes in the bow. They could carry a pair of reload torpedoes, but generally did not as they would have to remove an equal weight of fuel in compensation.

== Career ==
C25 was built by Vickers at Barrow and was commissioned on 28 May 1909.

While on patrol 15 nautical miles (17 mi; 28 km) east of Orford Ness on 6 July 1918, C25 was attacked by five German seaplanes returning from a raid on Lowestoft. They attacked out of the sun, and C25 was hit by their machine guns before she could use her single Lewis gun in defence. Her commanding officer, Lieutenant David Bell and two of the lookouts on the conning tower were killed outright, the fourth man present was mortally wounded. While the seaplanes continued their attack, the crew tried to drag him inside delaying the dive and then one of the bodies slid across the hull, its leg stopping the hatch from closing. Two more men were killed trying to push the body clear and in desperation the leg was cut off with a hacksaw. By this point German machine gun fire had punctured the hull and damaged the motors. An E-class submarine arrived in the area and drove off the German aircraft with its deck gun and then took C25 under tow. The holes in the pressure hull were plugged by clothes, and HMS E51 was able to tow C25. The seaplanes returned re-armed and ready to attack again, but they were driven off by the arrival of the destroyer HMS Lurcher.

HMS C25 was sold on 5 December 1921.
