= HMS Firedrake (1912) =

Acheron-class destroyer

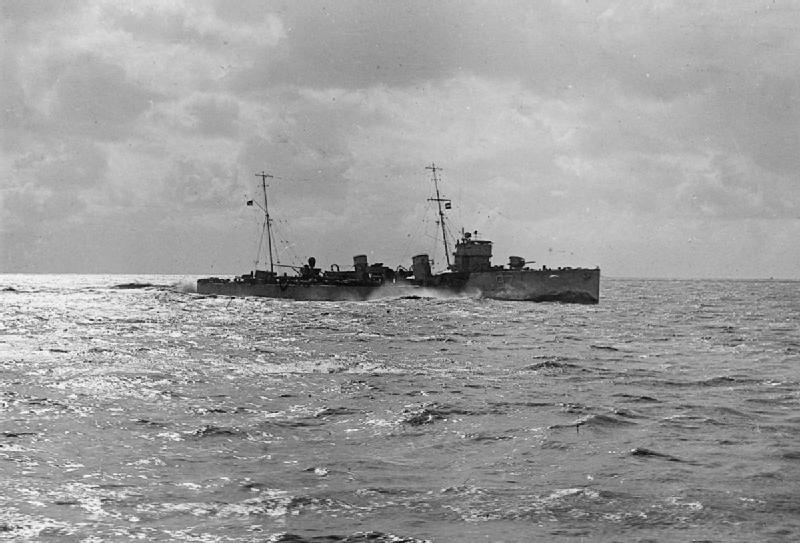
- HMS Firedrake during World War I

History

United Kingdom
- Name: HMS Firedrake
- Builder: Yarrow & Company, Scotstoun, Glasgow
- Yard number: 1304
- Laid down: 1 July 1911
- Launched: 9 April 1912
- Commissioned: September 1912
- Honours and awards: Heligoland 1914
- Fate: Sold for scrap on 10 October 1921

General characteristics
- Class & type: Acheron-class destroyer
- Displacement: 773 long tons (785 t) normal; 866 long tons (880 t) deep load
- Length: 255 ft 0 in (77.72 m) pp; 261 ft 7 in (79.73 m) oa
- Beam: 27 ft 7 3/4 in (8.43 m)
- Draught: 8 ft 6 in (2.59 m)
- Installed power: 3 × Yarrow oil-fired boilers; 20,000 shp (15,000 kW) (design)
- Propulsion: 2 × Parsons turbines; 2 × shafts
- Speed: 32 kn (37 mph; 59 km/h) (contract); 33.17 kn (38.17 mph; 61.43 km/h) trials
- Complement: 72
- Armament: 2 × BL 4-inch (101.6 mm) L/40 Mark VIII guns, mounting P Mark V; 2 × QF 12 pounder 12 cwt naval gun, mounting P Mark I; 2 × single tubes for 21 inch (533 mm) torpedoes

HMS Firedrake was a modified Acheron-class destroyer, named after the fire-breathing dragon of Anglo-Saxon mythology, and the sixth ship of the Royal Navy to bear the name.

== Construction ==
Sir Alfred Yarrow maintained that it was possible to build strong, seaworthy destroyers with a speed of 32 knots (59 km/h; 37 mph), and a contract for three such boats was placed with Yarrow & Company of Scotstoun, Glasgow. The "Firedrake Specials", "Special I class" or "Yarrow Specials" were a little larger than the rest of the class but carried the same armament. Firedrake, Lurcher and Oak were, however, distinctive in appearance and at least 4 knots (7.4 km/h; 4.6 mph) faster than the rest of their class. They all exceeded their contract speed, Lurcher making over 35 knots (65 km/h; 40 mph). Firedrake became part of the Royal Navy's 1st Destroyer Flotilla.

== Curragh Incident ==
During the Curragh Incident in the spring of 1914, Firedrake was despatched to Kingstown (now Dún Laoghaire in the Republic of Ireland) in order to preserve communications between Lieutenant General Sir Arthur Paget in Dublin and the British Government in London. She left Southampton at 10:30pm on 19 March, making the passage in record time. The Unionists suspected that the naval movements were part of a plot to subdue Ulster, and Firedrake's captain, Lieutenant Commander B W Barrow, was ordered to report to Paget's Headquarters in civilian clothes.

Discomfort in the British Army with possible military action within Ireland was to some extent mirrored in the Royal Navy. In Firedrake, Engineer Lieutenant Ranken informed his captain "that I had signed the British Covenant and that I should be no party to any aggressive move against Ulster if that were the intention in sending us to Kingstown". Had General Paget, he declared, "joined for passage during my regime only one course was open to me - to decline to be a party to propelling the ship". Lieutenant Commander Barrow did not share his principles, and Ranken was relieved by another officer on 22 March. On 2 April all naval forces, including Firedrake, were withdrawn for Easter leave, with no intention to return them. Although the Royal Navy soon returned to prevent gun-running to the Ulster Volunteers, Firedrake does not appear to have taken part.

== World War One ==
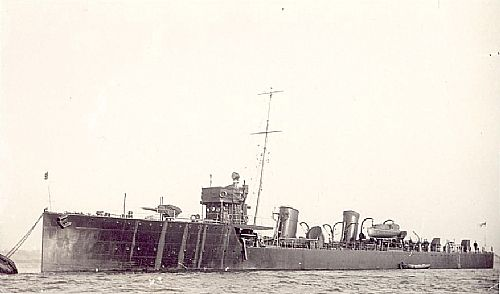
HMS Firedrake at a buoy

At the start of World War I Firedrake and Lurcher were assigned to the Eighth Submarine Flotilla under the command of Commodore Keyes, and were based at Parkeston Quay, Harwich. Both ships were employed in escorting, towing and exercising with submarines of their flotilla, and the more notable episodes are detailed below:

=== Landing of the BEF ===
From August 1914 the British and French Navies attempted to seal the English Channel against German naval attack; Firedrake and 12 submarines formed the north-eastern line. No transports carrying the British Expeditionary Force (BEF) were sunk, although the German Navy made little or no use of submarines against non-military ships at this stage of the war.

According to the despatches of Commodore Keyes,

During the transportation of the Expeditionary Force the Lurcher and Firedrake and all Submarines of the Eighth Submarine Flotilla occupied positions from which they could have attacked the High Seas Fleet, had it emerged to dispute the passage of our transports. This patrol was maintained day and night without relief, until the personnel of our Army had been transported and all chance of effective interference had disappeared.

=== The Battle of Heligoland Bight ===
On 26 August 1914 Commodore Keyes hoisted his broad pennant in Lurcher, leading Firedrake, two D-class and six E-class submarines eastwards into the North Sea. Also at sea were the destroyers of Commodore Reginald Tyrwhitt. The plan was to place elements of the High Seas Fleet between Royal Navy surface ships and bottomed Royal Navy submarines. Unknown to Keyes and Tyrwhitt, the Admiralty had added significant reinforcements at the last minute.

Keyes' despatch reads:

At midnight on the 26th August, I embarked in the Lurcher, and, in company with Firedrake and Submarines D2, D8, E4, E5, E6, E7, E8 and E9 of the Eighth Submarine Flotilla, proceeded to take part in the operations in the Heligoland bight arranged for the 28th August. The Destroyers scouted for submarines until nightfall on the 27th, when the latter proceeded independently to take up various positions from which they could co-operate with the Destroyer Flotillas on the following morning. At Daylight on the 28th August, the Lurcher and Firedrake searched the area through which the Battle Cruisers were to advance for hostile Submarines, and then proceeded towards Heligoland in the wake of Submarines E6, E7 and E8, which were exposing themselves with the object of inducing the enemy to chase them to the westward.

Battle was joined at 7:00 on 28 August in misty conditions. Due to lack of information about reinforcements sent by the Admiralty, great potential existed for fratricidal attacks; at 8:15 am Firedrake and Lurcher came close to attacking the cruisers Lowestoft and Nottingham.

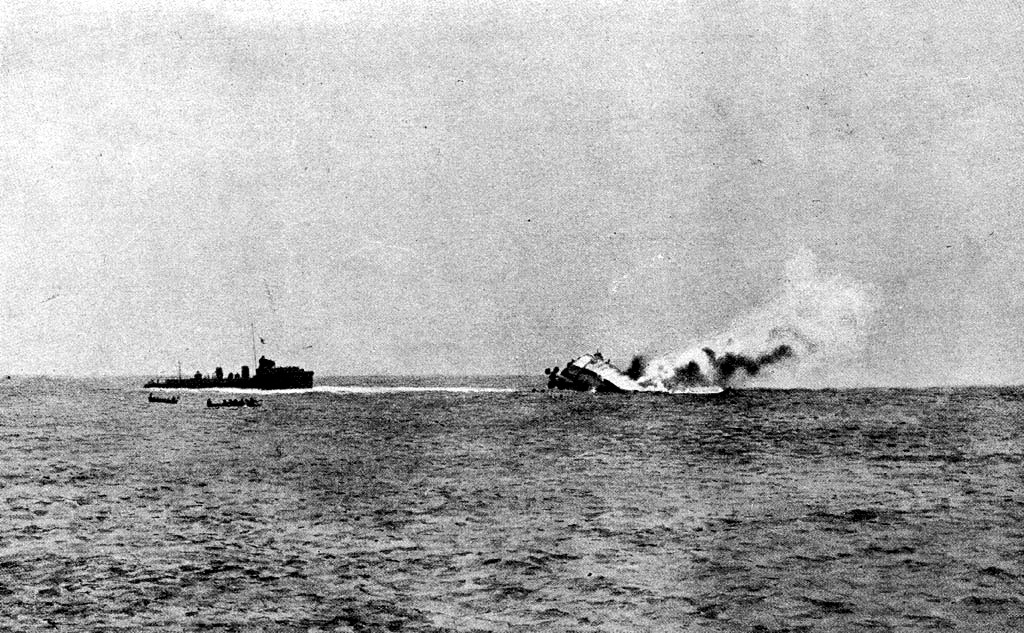
SMS Mainz sinking, with Lurcher and boats of Liverpool to the left of the picture

After the German cruiser Mainz was heavily damaged and disabled, Commodore Goodenough ordered his ships to cease firing on her at 12:55 pm and a rescue operation was undertaken. Liverpool, accompanied by Firedrake and Lurcher, manoeuvred close to Mainz in an effort to recover the surviving crew. Boats from Liverpool were deployed to retrieve those who had abandoned ship while Lurcher positioned alongside Mainz to transfer the crew who remained on board. By 1:10pm the Royal Navy ships withdrew as the height of tide was high enough to allow larger Imperial German Navy units to enter the area. Although the operation had been something of a shambles in the mist, the results were clear: Three German light cruisers and a destroyer sunk against no Royal Navy losses.

=== Submarines in the Baltic ===
On 22 September 1914 Firedrake and Lurcher towed the submarines E1 and E5 towards the Skagerrak. This was the first act in a long saga that culminated in a British submarine flotilla in the Baltic.

=== Raid on Scarborough ===
By 14 December 1914 the Admiralty had advance warning of the intended raid on Scarborough, Hartlepool and Whitby through signals intelligence. Commodore Keyes was ordered to send eight submarines and his two command destroyers, Lurcher and Firedrake, to take stations off the island of Terschelling to catch the German ships should they turn west into the English Channel. On 16 December, as the situation developed, the submarines were ordered to move to the Heligoland Bight in order to intercept returning German ships. They failed, although one torpedo was fired at SMS Posen by HMS E11, which missed. As a last-ditch attempt to catch Hipper, the Admiralty ordered Keyes to take his two destroyers and attempt to torpedo Hipper as he returned home around 2 am. on 17 December. Keyes himself had considered this and wanted to try, but the message was delayed and failed to reach him until too late.

=== Search for submarine C31 ===
On 7 January 1915 both Firedrake and Lurcher carried out a search for the missing British submarine C31, to little avail; it transpired later that she had been mined off the Belgian coast on 4 January.

=== Capture of UC-5 ===
UC-5 displayed in Central Park

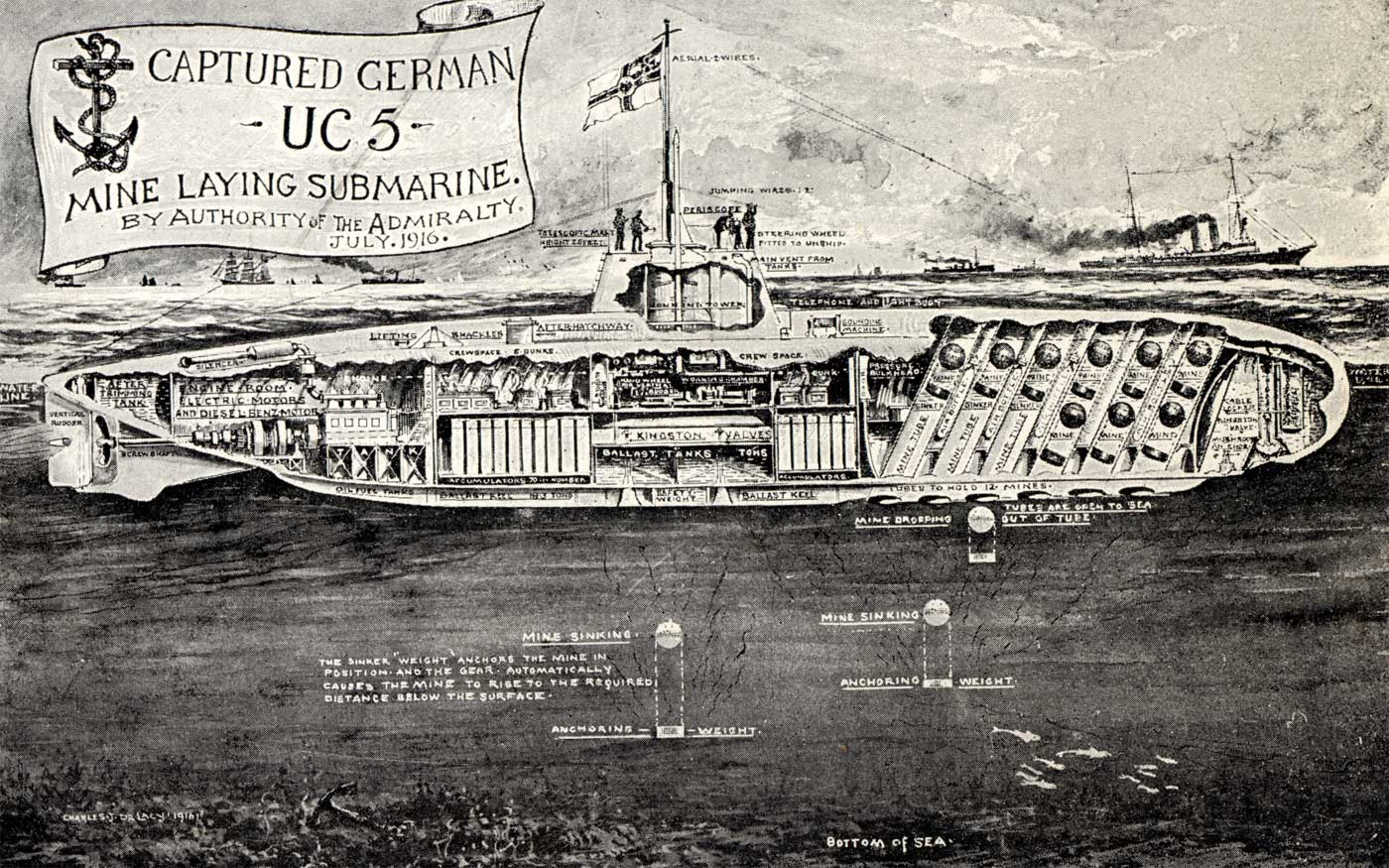
Sketch of the German submarine UC-5

On 27 April 1916, the German submarine UC-5, under the command of Oberleutnant zur See Ulrich Mohrbutter, ran aground on Shipwash Shoal in position 52°03′N 01°46′E. Firedrake captured the U-boat at 1:00pm relatively intact; apart from some damage incurred in the grounding, the crew had taken measures to damage instruments and equipment, including firing small arms at them, and seven destruction charges had caused several holes in the pressure hull. UC-5 was towed to Harwich and placed in a dry dock, where she was examined and reconditioned. She was displayed at Temple Pier on the Thames in London, and later moved to New York, where she was displayed in Central Park. Firedrake's captain, Commander Aubrey Thomas Tillard was mentioned in dispatches for his part in the capture.

=== Sinking of UC-51 ===
Some sources state that UC-51 commanded by Oberleutnant zur See Hans Galster was sunk by Firedrake on 13 November or 17 November 1917, either off Harwich or Start Point. It seems most likely that UC-51 was mined in the English Channel and lies in position 50°08′N 03°42′W off Start Point.

== Disposal ==
Firedrake survived the war and was sold to J Smith for breaking on 10 October 1921.

== Pennant numbers ==
Pennant Number	From	To
H97	6 December 1914	1 January 1918
H33	1 January 1918	Early 1919
H89	Early 1919	10 October 1921

== HMS Firedrake in fiction ==
"The Man Who Won the War", a 1936 short story by Robert Buckner, featured Roger Bradman as the commanding officer of Firedrake who, in the early days of World War I, lands on the Belgian coast and devises a plan that succeeds in stopping the German Army from reaching Paris. It was first printed in Atlantic Monthly in February 1936, and then reprinted in Reader's Digest (April 1936) and The Best American Short Stories of 1937.
