= Howard Knox =

Howard Vincent Knox (1868–1960), birth name Howard Vicenté Knox, was a British Army officer and philosopher, known as a proponent of pragmatism.

== Early life ==
He was the fourth son of André Blasini Knox (1839–1885) of Trinidad, a barrister. He matriculated at Exeter College, Oxford in 1886. At Oxford he passed "for the army".

== Military career ==
Knox's career in the British Army was twice interrupted by bad health. He graduated from the Royal Military College, Sandhurst in 1890 and joined the Norfolk Regiment. In 1891 he resigned his commission, on health grounds.

In 1900 Knox joined the Army Reserve, and in 1901 was given a post in the Royal Garrison Regiment with rank of lieutenant; he served in Malta and Gibraltar. In November 1903, with the rank of captain in his Regiment, he was again removed from the British Army for health reasons

In 1914 Knox supported the British Covenant. At the beginning of World War I, Knox joined the Oxfordshire and Buckinghamshire Light Infantry as captain. He became in 1916 a Balloon Officer in the Royal Flying Corps, serving in France. He again encountered health problems but remained in the Army until the war ended in 1918.

== Later life ==
Knox became domestic bursar of Corpus Christi College, Oxford, for a period ending by 1930.

== Philosophy ==
Knox was a life-long friend of F. C. S. Schiller; Knox "exchanged hundreds of letters with Schiller over the course of their lives on topics ranging from home life to philosophy." Schiller in 1901 brought out Mind!, a parody of the leading philosophical journal Mind, to which Knox contributed, taking as targets Aristotle and T. H. Green.

Schiller was concerned principally with an anthropocentric doctrine he styled "humanism", and from 1900 looked to pragmatism for support. The basis of the friendship was Knox's introduction to Schiller of the work of Alfred Sidgwick (1850–1943), a philosophical ally. A further member of this pragmatist group was Henry Cecil Sturt (1863–1946). Shook commented that this British pragmatism "blindly strikes out at other positions".

As a reader of the thought of William James, Cheryl Misak classes Knox with Chauncey Wright, George Santayana and C. S. Peirce. Knox found to recommend in James the concept that Darwinism was an argument against mechanistic philosophy; Knox wrote to Schiller in 1904, conversely, "if Darwinism didn't exist, pragmatism would have to invent it." In his major work The Will to Be Free (1928) he attacked what he called the "deterministic principle", and argued that traditional logic required reform along lines suggested by Schiller.

== Works ==
- The Philosophy of William James (1914). Knox had corresponded with William James in a period from 1909 to a few months before his death in 1910.
- The Will to be Free: A Critique of Deterministic Theory and a Vindication of Real Alternatives in Human Purpose (1928), with Preface by L. P. Jacks and J. A. Stewart. On p.xvi it is stated that Knox wrote the work while holding a research fellowship at Manchester College, Oxford.
- The Evolution of Truth: And Other Essays (1930) Reprinted the 1909 paper Pragmatism: The Evolution of Truth.

== Alpinist ==
Knox went to Switzerland for skiing vacations. In the 1880s he climbed in the Alps, in 1888 in the Engadin. He climbed again from 1905, when he was in the Oberland, and made guideless climbs with F. W. Bourdillon. In 1906 he was with Schiller in the Engadin, Dolomites, Oberland and Valais.

From 1907 to 1909 Knox lived at Grindelwald. He joined the Alpine Club in 1907. With the guide Josef Lochmatter he made the second descent of the Weisshorn Schaligrat. In 1908/9 he suffered a number of serious accidents. In November 1909 he gave a lecture "Use of Ski, and Training of British Soldiers for Duties on Snow-Clad Frontiers" at the Royal United Services Institute, chaired by Henry Hughes Wilson.

== Family ==
Knox was twice married. He married, firstly in 1891, to Alice Grant Hobbs. He married, secondly in 1930, Nesta Thomas. Marjorie Kaufman in her 1963 article "William James's Letters to a Young Pragmatist" thanked Mrs. Howard V. Knox of Oxford for access to letters.

== Legacy ==
Knox left manuscript correspondence involving his ancestor William Knox. An introduction by Sophia Crawford Lomas gives the provenance via two of William Knox's daughters, and then in 1889 to Howard Knox, his great-great-grandson, and his wife.
