= HMS Oak (1912) =

Destroyer of the Royal Navy

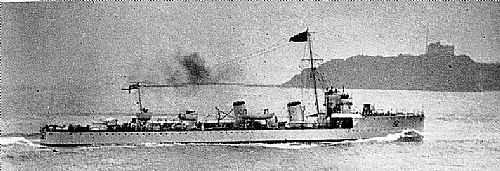
- HMS Oak showing her white hull and flying the Royal Standard of King George V, 20 November 1918

History

United Kingdom
- Name: HMS Oak
- Builder: Yarrow & Company, Scotstoun, Glasgow
- Yard number: 1306
- Launched: 5 September 1912
- Fate: Sold May 1921, scrapped 1922

General characteristics
- Class & type: Acheron-class destroyer
- Displacement: 990 tons
- Length: 75 m (246 ft)
- Beam: 7.8 m (26 ft)
- Draught: 2.7 m (8.9 ft)
- Installed power: 20,000 shp (15,000 kW)
- Propulsion: 2 × Parsons turbines; 3 × Yarrow oil-fired boilers; 2 × shafts
- Speed: 32 kn (59 km/h)
- Complement: 70
- Armament: 2 × BL 4-inch (102 mm) Mark VIII guns, mounting P Mark V; 2 × QF 12-pounder (76 mm) guns, mounting P Mark I; 2 × single tubes for 21-inch (533 mm) torpedoes

HMS Oak was a modified Acheron-class destroyer of the Royal Navy. Launched in 1912, she saw extensive service during World War I as a tender to the flagship of the Grand Fleet, and for this purpose she was painted white, instead of the usual warship grey. She was sold in 1921 to be scrapped. Named after the Oak tree (genus Quercus), she was only the second ship of the Royal Navy to carry the name, and the first for over 250 years.

== Pennant numbers ==
Pennant number	From	To
H12	6 December 1914	1 September 1915
H38	1 September 1915	1 January 1918
H92 (92)	1 January 1918	Early 1919
H56	Early 1919	May 1921

== Construction ==
Sir Alfred Yarrow maintained that it was possible to build strong, seaworthy destroyers with a speed of 32 kn (59 km/h), and eventually a contract for three such boats was placed with Yarrow & Company of Scotstoun, Glasgow. The "Firedrake Specials", "Special I class" or "Yarrow Specials" were a little larger than the rest of the class but carried the same armament. Firedrake, Lurcher and Oak were, however, distinctive in appearance and at least 4 knots faster than the rest of their class. They all exceeded their contract speed, Lurcher making over 35 knots (65 km/h). Oak, the last of the class, was launched on 5 September 1912.

== Wartime service ==
Oak was tender to the flagship of the Grand Fleet throughout the war, including the Battle of Jutland, and had the distinction of having the same commanding officer, Lieutenant Commander Douglas Faviell MVO, all her career. Her hull was painted white to distinguish her, and in the course of her duties she often carried the most important visitors. Of note, King George V travelled to Scapa Flow in 1915 for a two-day review of the Grand Fleet, crossing from Thurso. Oak also carried Lord Kitchener from Scrabster to Scapa Flow on 5 June 1916 before transferring him to the cruiser Hampshire, which struck a mine shortly before 19:30 the same day, with the loss of all but 12 crew, including Field Marshal Kitchener.

== Surrender of the German High Sea Fleet (1918) ==
Distinctive in her white paint, Oak carried the German Rear-Admiral Hugo Meurer from the cruiser Königsberg to surrender on 15 November 1918, to Admiral Sir David Beatty on board his flagship, HMS Queen Elizabeth, in the Firth of Forth.

Under the terms of the Armistice, the German High Seas Fleet went into internment at the Royal Navy's base at Scapa Flow - in Operation ZZ, 60 Allied battleships escorted 11 battleships, 5 battlecruisers, 8 cruisers and 48 destroyers of the High Seas Fleet into captivity. At 11:00 on 20 November 1918 King George V, Queen Mary and the Prince of Wales embarked in Oak and, preceded by the destroyer Verdun, steamed through the fleet, the Royal Standard at Oak's mainmast, cheered by every ship.

== Disposal ==
Oak was sold in May 1921 for breaking.
