= Cecil Dampier =

Royal Navy Admiral (1868–1950)

Admiral Cecil Dampier CMG
- Photographed by Walter Stoneman in 1918
- Born: 11 May 1868
- Died: 11 April 1950 (aged 81); Gloucester, England
- Allegiance: United Kingdom
- Branch: Royal Navy
- Rank: Admiral
- Commands: Cambridge; Audacious
- Battles / wars: First World War
- Awards: Companion of the Order of St Michael and St George

Admiral Cecil Frederick Dampier CMG (11 May 1868 – 11 April 1950) was a Royal Navy officer during the First World War.

== Naval career ==
Dampier entered the Royal Navy and was promoted to the rank of Commander on 1 January 1900.

He was posted to the gunnery ship Cambridge off Plymouth on 27 May 1902.

He was captain of Audacious, which spent her entire career assigned to the Home and Grand Fleets. She was sunk by a German mine off the northern coast of County Donegal, Ireland, in October 1914.

Dampier was Second-in-Command of a Battle Squadron during the early parts of the First World War, and Admiral-Superintendent at Dover in 1917.

In May 1918 he was involved in remote control trials of unmanned aerial vehicles by the Royal Navy's D.C.B. Section.

He was appointed a Companion of the Order of St Michael and St George (CMG) in the 1919 New Year Honours.
