= HMS M3 (1918) =

Submarine of the Royal Navy

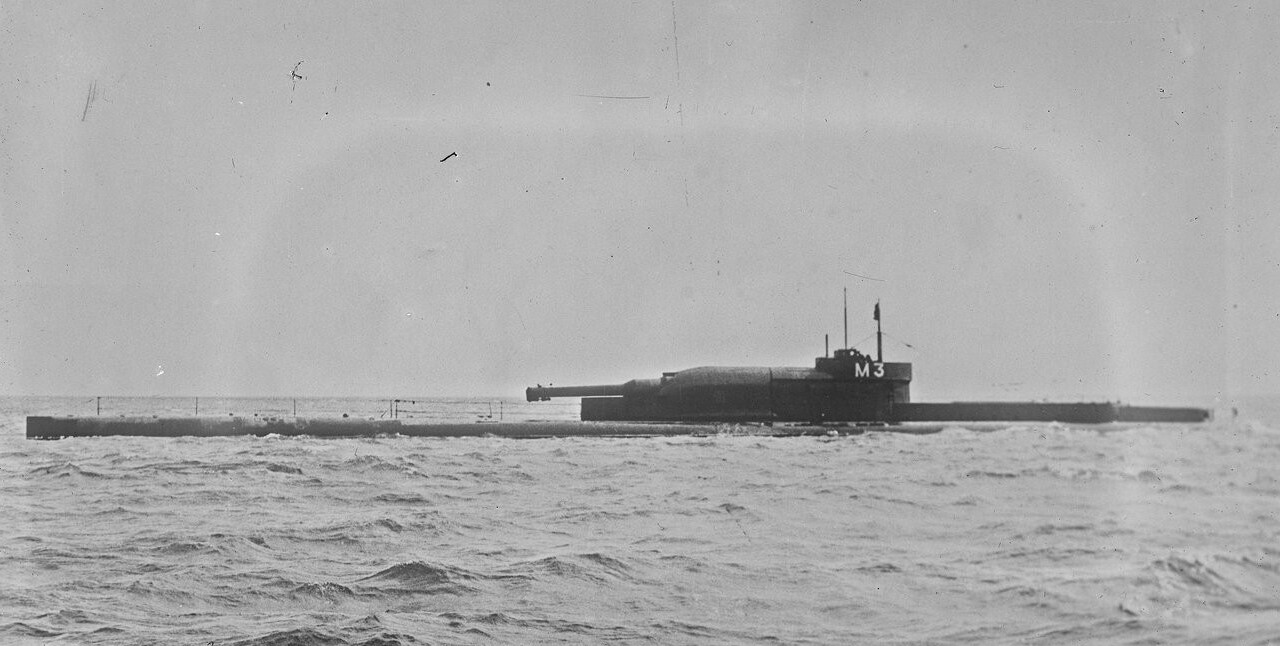
- HMS M3 in 1921

History

United Kingdom
- Name: HMS M3
- Builder: Armstrong Whitworth
- Launched: 19 October 1918
- Commissioned: 16 March 1920
- Decommissioned: 17 August 1920
- Recommissioned: 4 July 1921
- Decommissioned: 15 October 1926
- Fate: Sold for scrap, 16 February 1932

General characteristics
- Class & type: M-class submarine
- Displacement: 1,594 long tons (1,620 t) surfaced; 1,946 long tons (1,977 t) submerged
- Length: 305 ft 9 in (93.19 m)
- Beam: 24 ft 8 in (7.52 m)
- Propulsion: 2 × 12-cylinder Vickers 1,200 hp (890 kW) diesel engines; 4 × 800 hp (600 kW) electric motors; 2 × 3-blade 5 ft 10 in (1.78 m) diameter screws
- Speed: 15 knots (28 km/h) surfaced; 8–9 kn (15–17 km/h) submerged
- Range: Surfaced: 2,000 nmi (3,700 km) at 15 kn (28 km/h); 4,500 nmi (8,300 km) at 10 kn (19 km/h); Submerged: 9 nmi (17 km) at 17 kn (31 km/h); 80 nmi (150 km) at 2 kn (3.7 km/h)
- Test depth: 200 ft (61 m)
- Complement: 62
- Armament: As built: 1 × 12-inch (305mm)/40 cal Mark IX gun with 50 rounds; 1 × 3 in (76 mm) Mk II HA anti-aircraft gun; 4 × 21 inch (533 mm) bow torpedo tubes with 4 reload torpedoes; After 1928: 4 × 21-inch (533mm) bow torpedo tubes with 4 reload torpedoes; 100 Type B mines

HMS M3, built by Armstrong Whitworth, Newcastle Upon Tyne was an M-class submarine of the Royal Navy.

== Construction and commissioning ==
M3 was ordered from Armstrong Whitworth on 28 July 1916 and laid down at Elswick in December as an M-class submarine, but was referred to as K20. She was launched on 19 October 1918, and commissioned as M3 on 16 March 1920. After completion of trials on 17 August, she was placed in reserve.

== Service ==
M3 was recommissioned on 4 July 1921 under the command of Lieutenant-Commander Hugh Marrack, and joined the 1st Submarine Flotilla on 17 February 1922.

From 9 May to 14 May 1926, along with fellow submarines K26 and L23, M3 was used to help supply electricity to the Royal Victoria Dock, Royal Albert Dock and King George V Dock in London, during the General Strike of 1926, in an action named Operation Blackcurrant. M3 alone kept four meat cold stores, two cranes, and many important pumps running.

== Minelayer ==
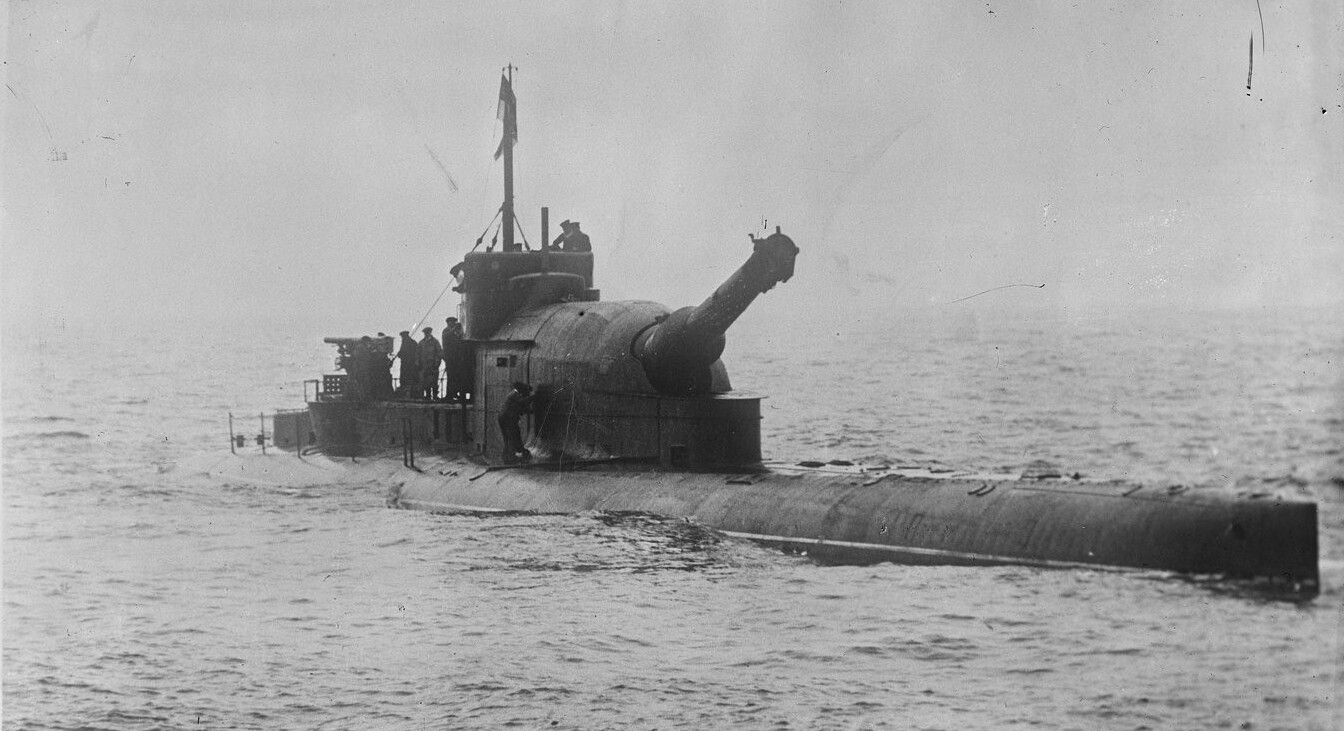
M3, original monitor configuration

M3, minelayer configuration (1928 onwards)

On 15 October 1926 M3 was placed in reserve until 13 June 1927 when she arrived at Chatham to be converted to an experimental minelayer, as a result of the Washington Naval Treaty. The conversion was called a refit for political reasons. Her 12-inch (305 mm) and 3-inch (76.2 mm) guns were removed to make room for a large free-flooding superstructure extending over about 75% of her length. Two sets of rails ran along the pressure hull inside this structure, capable of accommodating 100 standard Type B contact mines. The mines were laid by means of a conveyor chain through a single large door at the stern.

The conversion was completed on 8 October 1928 at a contemporary cost of £10,235, and M3 finished her trials by the middle of November. Only 80 mines were carried initially, the remaining 20 being embarked later.

The minelaying machinery and mines added approximately 54 tons to the submarine's mass, and also had adverse effects on M3's diving ability - the time required to flood the large casing (which held 600 tons of water) meant that it took around 5 minutes to dive in calm weather, and at least 13 minutes in rough weather, and was dangerously slow to catch a trim. Rear Admiral Martin Dunbar-Nasmith, head of the Submarine Service, was of the opinion in May 1930, that "...at present M3 is not efficient or reliable as a submarine and could not with safety be used in war".

M3 was originally to be scrapped in 1933, but the date was brought forward after the unfavourable reports of her abilities as a minelayer, and she was sold out of service on 6 February 1932, and was scrapped at Newport in April 1932.

Experience gained from the converted M3 was used in the design of the Porpoise-class minelaying submarines, which carried their mines in a single row.

== Other ships ==
The monitor HMS Raglan was also known by the name HMS M3 for a short time.
