= HMS Audacious (1912) =

King George V–class battleship

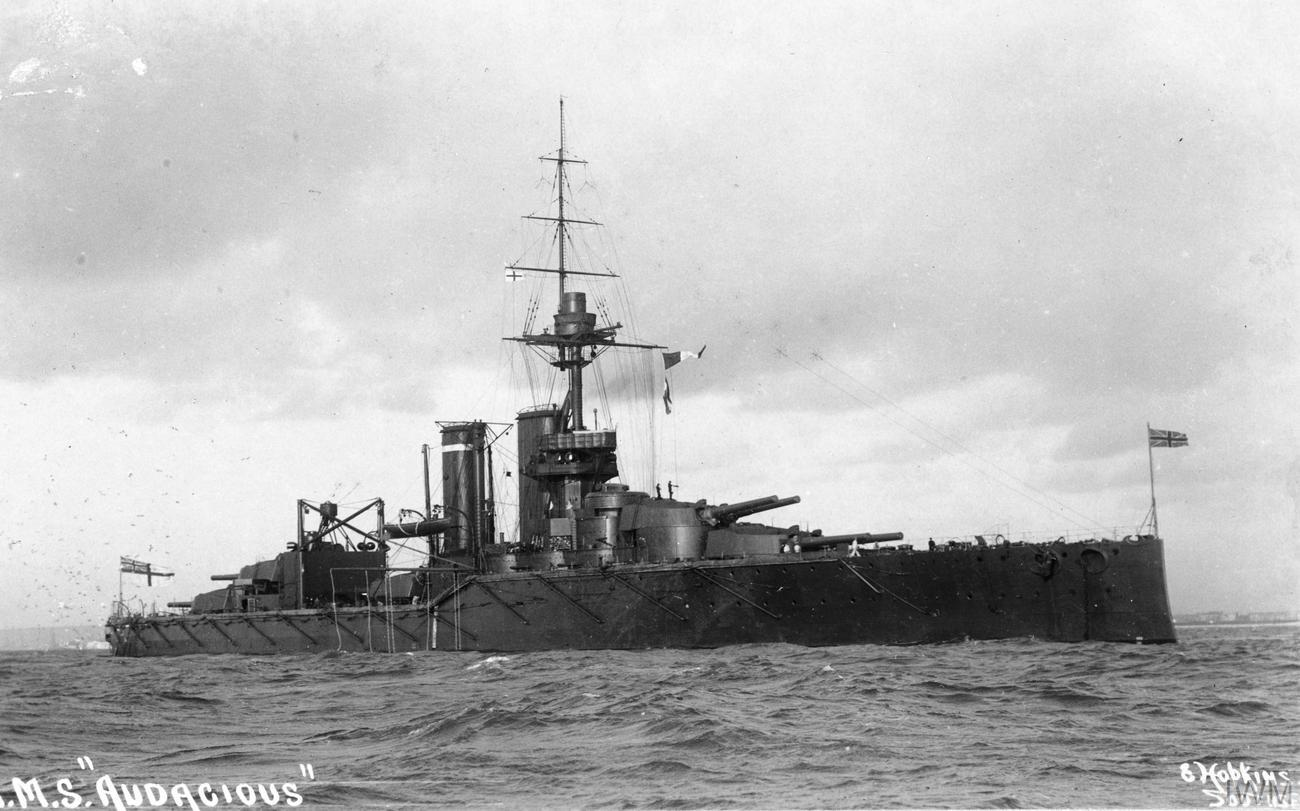
- Audacious about 1913–1914

History

United Kingdom
- Name: Audacious
- Ordered: 1910
- Builder: Cammell Laird, Birkenhead
- Laid down: 23 March 1911
- Launched: 14 September 1912
- Completed: August 1913
- Commissioned: 15 October 1913
- Fate: Sunk by a mine off the northern coast of County Donegal in Ulster, 27 October 1914

General characteristics (as built)
- Class & type: King George V-class dreadnought battleship
- Displacement: 25,420 long tons (25,830 t) (normal)
- Length: 597 ft 9 in (182.2 m) (o/a)
- Beam: 89 ft 1 in (27.2 m)
- Draught: 28 ft 8 in (8.7 m)
- Installed power: 18 × Yarrow boilers; 27,000 shp (20,000 kW)
- Propulsion: 4 × shafts; 2 × steam turbine sets
- Speed: 21 knots (39 km/h; 24 mph)
- Range: 5,910 nmi (10,950 km; 6,800 mi) at 10 knots (19 km/h; 12 mph)
- Complement: 860 (1914)
- Armament: 5 × twin 13.5-inch (343 mm) guns; 16 × single 4-inch (102 mm) guns; 3 × 21-inch (533 mm) torpedo tubes
- Armour: Belt: 12 in (305 mm); Decks: 1–4 in (25–102 mm); Turrets: 11 in (280 mm); Barbettes: 10 in (254 mm)

HMS Audacious was the fourth and last King George V-class dreadnought battleship built for the Royal Navy in the early 1910s. After completion in 1913, she spent her brief 2-year career assigned to the Home and Grand Fleets. The ship struck a German naval mine off the northern coast of County Donegal in Ulster, Ireland, in the early days of the First World War. Audacious slowly flooded, allowing all of her crew to be rescued, and finally sank after the British were unable to tow her to shore. However, a petty officer on a nearby cruiser was killed by shrapnel when Audacious subsequently exploded. Even though American tourists aboard one of the rescuing ships photographed and filmed the sinking battleship, the Admiralty embargoed news of her loss in Britain to prevent the Germans from taking advantage of the weakened Grand Fleet. She is the largest warship ever sunk by naval mines.

== Design and description ==
The King George V–class ships were designed as enlarged and improved versions of the preceding Orion-class battleships. They had an overall length of 597 feet 9 inches (182.2 m), a beam of 89 feet 1 inch (27.2 m) and a draught of 28 feet 8 inches (8.7 m). They displaced 25,420 long tons (25,830 t) at normal load and 27,120 long tons (27,560 t) at deep load. Audacious's crew numbered 860 officers and ratings in 1914.

Ships of the King George V class were powered by two sets of Parsons direct-drive steam turbines, each driving two shafts using steam provided by 18 Yarrow boilers. The turbines were rated at a total of 27,000 shaft horsepower (20,000 kW) and were intended to give the battleships a speed of 21 knots (39 km/h; 24 mph). Audacious carried enough coal and fuel oil to give her a range of 5,910 nautical miles (10,950 km; 6,800 mi) at a cruising speed of 10 knots (19 km/h; 12 mph).

=== Armament and armour ===
Like the Orion class, the King George Vs were equipped with 10 breech-loading (BL) 13.5-inch (343 mm) Mark V guns in five hydraulically powered twin-gun turrets. There were a pair of superfiring turrets fore and aft of the superstructure and another amidships, all on the centreline. Their secondary armament consisted of 16 BL 4-inch (102 mm) Mark VII guns. Eight of these were mounted in the forward superstructure, four in the aft superstructure, and four in casemates in the side of the hull abreast of the forward main-gun turrets, all in single mounts. The ships were equipped with three 21-inch (533 mm) submerged torpedo tubes, one on each broadside and another in the stern, for which 14 torpedoes were provided.

The King George V–class ships were protected by a waterline 12-inch (305 mm) armoured belt that extended between the end barbettes. Their decks ranged in thickness between 1 inch (25 mm) and 4 inches with the thickest portions protecting the steering gear in the stern. The main battery turret faces were 11 inches (280 mm) thick, and the turrets were supported by 10-inch-thick (254 mm) barbettes.

==== Modifications ====
Audacious was fitted with a fire-control director on the roof of the spotting top before her loss.

== Construction and career ==
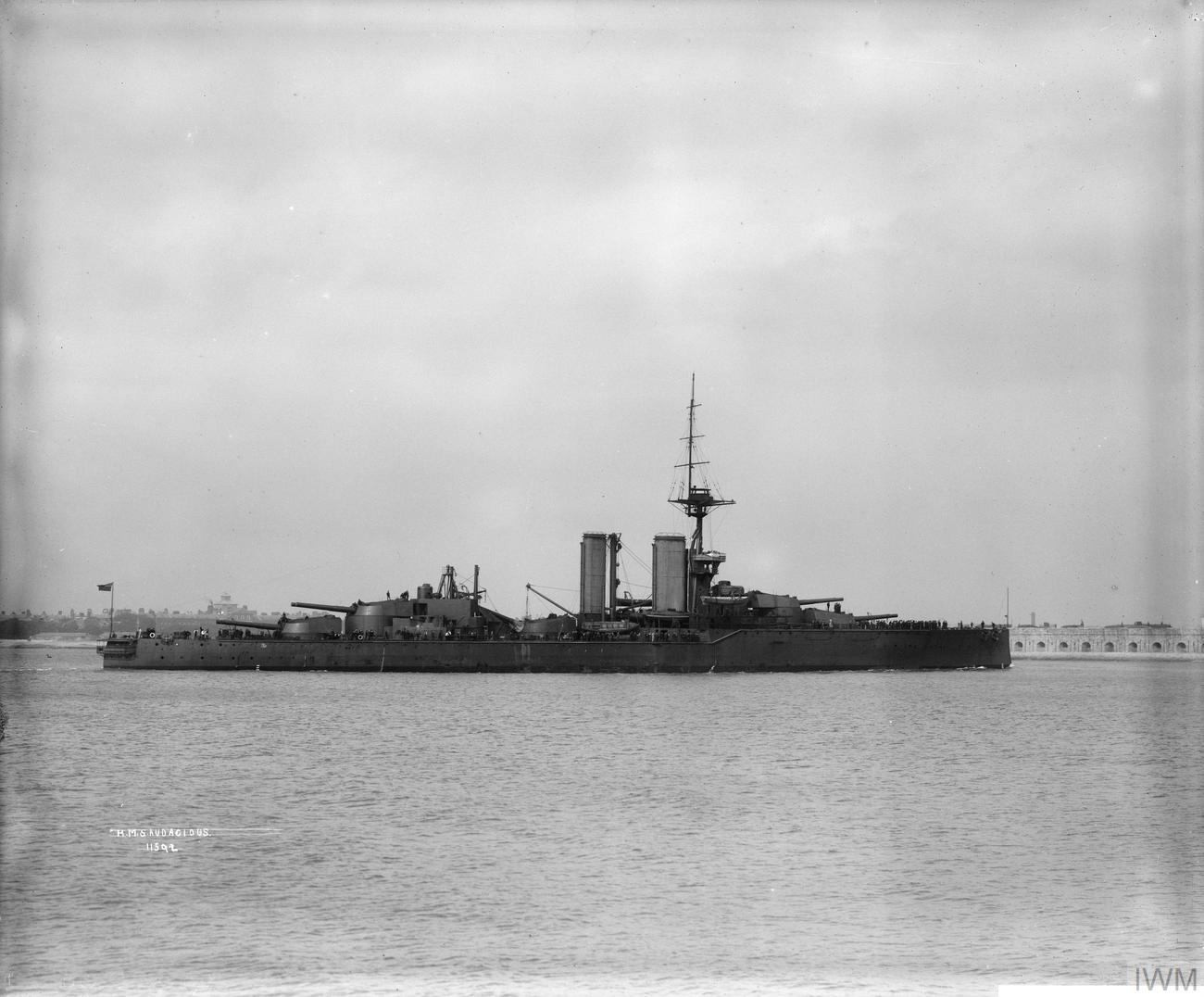
Audacious as completed, 1913

Ordered under the 1910–1911 Naval Estimates, Audacious was the third ship of her name to serve in the Royal Navy. The ship was laid down by Cammell Laird at their shipyard in Birkenhead on 23 March 1911 and launched on 14 September 1912. She was completed in August 1913 at a cost of £1,918,813, but was not commissioned until 15 October, joining her sister ships in the 2nd Battle Squadron. All four sisters represented the Royal Navy during the celebrations of the re-opening of the Kaiser Wilhelm Canal in Germany in June 1914.

=== World War I ===
Between 17 and 20 July, Audacious took part in a test mobilisation and fleet review as part of the British response to the July Crisis. Arriving at the Isle of Portland on 25 July, she was ordered to proceed with the rest of the Home Fleet to Scapa Flow off the coast of Scotland four days later to safeguard the fleet from a possible surprise attack by the Imperial German Navy. Following the start of World War I in August, the Home Fleet was reorganised as the Grand Fleet, and placed under the command of Admiral Sir John Jellicoe. The following month, the ship was refitted at HM Dockyard, Devonport, and rejoined the Grand Fleet at the beginning of October.

==== Sinking ====
Repeated reports of submarines in Scapa Flow led Jellicoe to conclude that the defences there were inadequate and he ordered that the Grand Fleet be dispersed to other bases until the defences were reinforced. On 16 October, the 2nd Battle Squadron was sent to Loch na Keal on the western coast of Scotland. The squadron departed for gunnery practice off Tory Island, just off the north-west coast of County Donegal in the north-west of Ulster, the northern province in Ireland, on the morning of 27 October and Audacious struck a mine at 08:45, laid a few days earlier by the German auxiliary minelayer SS Berlin. Captain Cecil Dampier, thinking that his ship had been torpedoed, hoisted the submarine warning; in accordance with instructions the other dreadnoughts departed the area, leaving the smaller ships behind to render assistance.

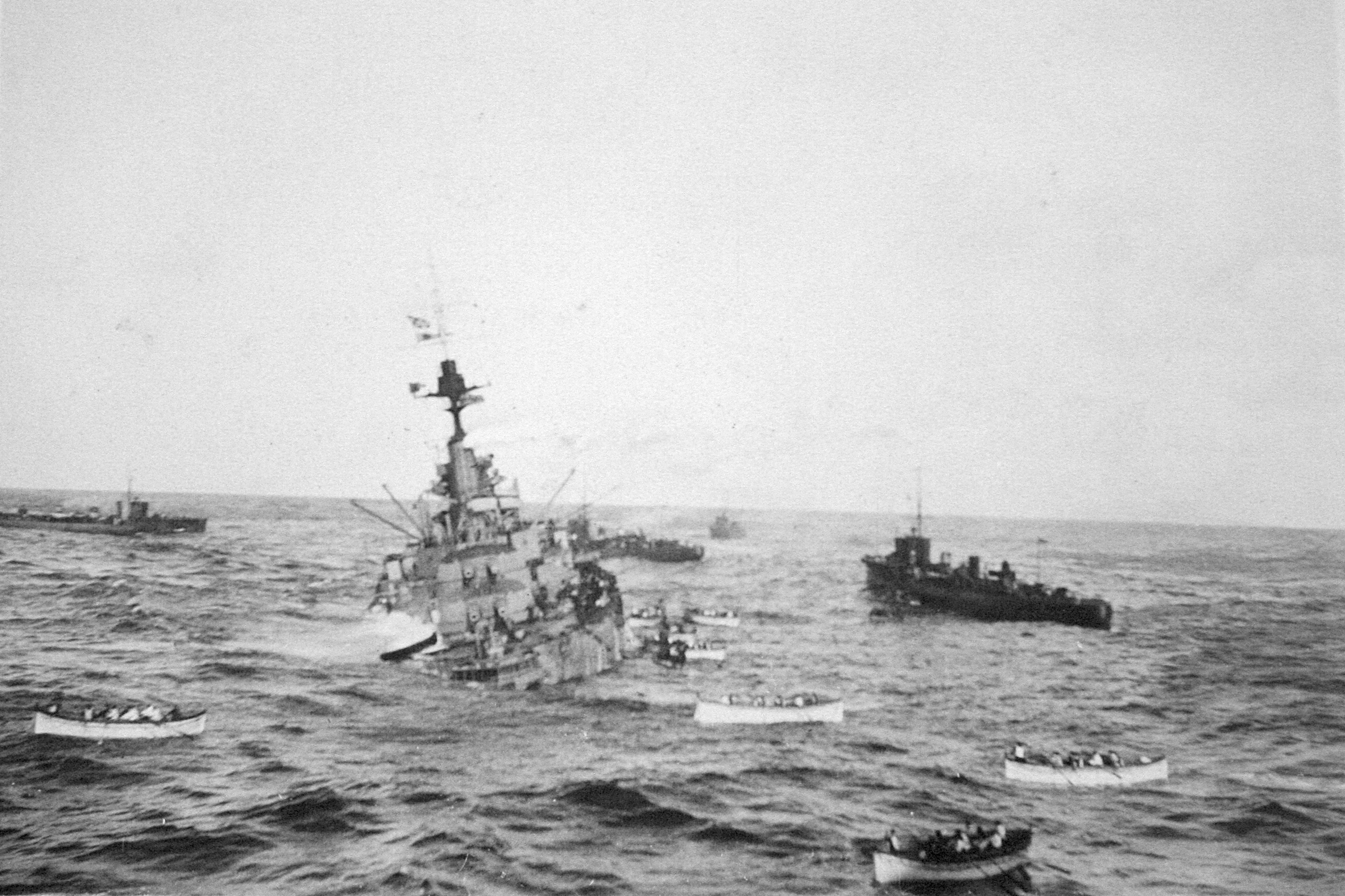
The crew of Audacious take to lifeboats to be taken aboard Olympic

The explosion occurred 16 feet (4.9 m) under the bottom of the ship, approximately 10 feet (3 m) forward of the transverse bulkhead at the rear of the port engine room. The engine room and the outer compartments adjacent to it flooded immediately, with water spreading more slowly to the central engine room and adjoining spaces. The ship rapidly took on a list to port of up to 15 degrees, which was reduced by counter-flooding compartments on the starboard side, so that by 09:45, the list ranged up to only nine degrees as she rolled in the heavy swell. The light cruiser Liverpool stood by, while Jellicoe ordered every available destroyer and tug out to assist, but did not send out any battleships to tow Audacious because of the supposed submarine threat. Having intercepted the stricken dreadnought's distress calls, the White Star ocean liner RMS Olympic arrived on the scene.

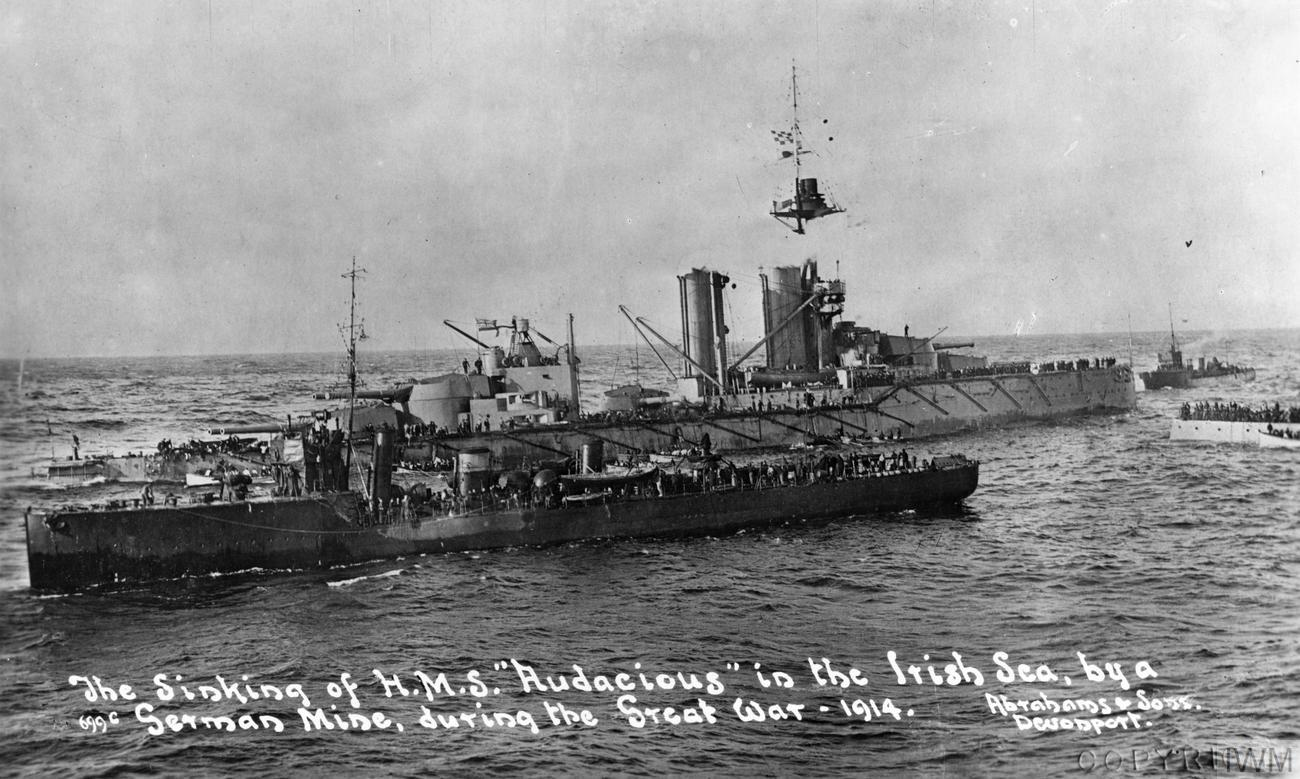
Destroyers evacuate crewmen

The ship could make 9 knots (17 km/h; 10 mph) and Dampier believed that he had a chance of making the 25 miles (40 km) to land and beaching the ship, so he turned Audacious south and made for Lough Swilly. The ship had covered 15 miles (24 km) when the rising water forced the abandonment of the centre and starboard engine rooms and she drifted to a stop at 10:50. Dampier ordered all non-essential crew to be taken off, boats from Liverpool and Olympic assisting, and only 250 men were left aboard by 14:00. At 13:30, Captain Herbert Haddock, the captain of Olympic, suggested that his ship attempt to take Audacious in tow. Dampier agreed, and with the assistance of the destroyer Fury, a tow line was passed 30 minutes later. The ships began moving, but the line snapped as Audacious repeatedly tried to turn into the wind. Liverpool and the newly arrived collier SS Thornhill then attempted to take the battleship in tow, but the lines broke before any progress could be made.

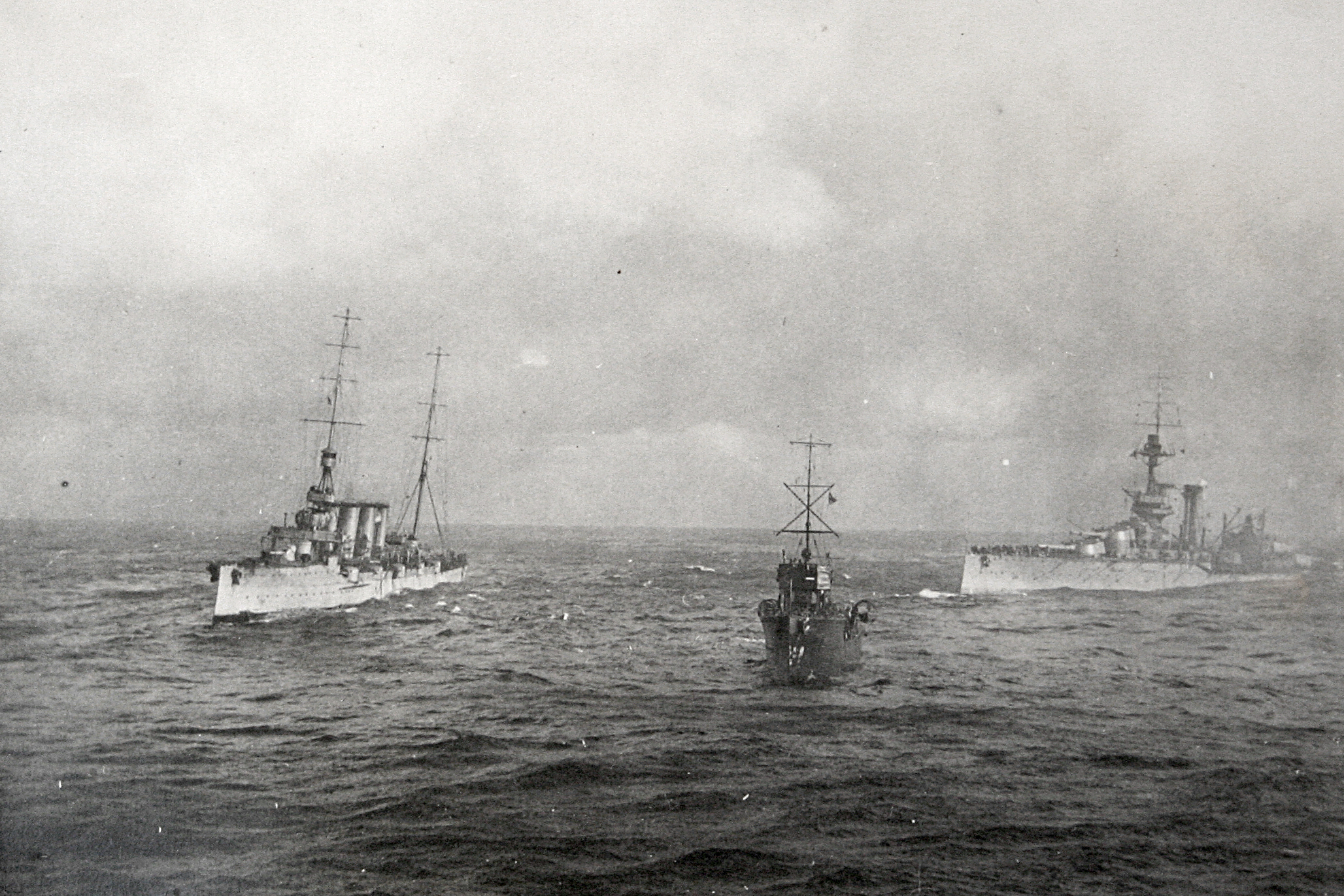
Liverpool (left) and Fury (centre), in combination with Olympic, try to take Audacious in tow (View from Olympic)

Vice-Admiral Sir Lewis Bayly, commander of the 1st Battle Squadron, arrived on the scene in the ocean boarding vessel Cambria and took over the rescue operation. Upon learning that two ships had been mined in the area the day before, and that there was no threat from submarines, Jellicoe ordered the pre-dreadnought battleship Exmouth to sail at 17:00 for an attempt to tow Audacious. Dampier ordered all but 50 men to be removed at 17:00 and Bayly, Dampier and the remaining men on the ship were taken off at 18:15 with dark approaching.

Just as Exmouth was coming up on the group at 20:45, Audacious heeled sharply, paused, and then capsized. She floated upside down with the bow raised until 21:00, when an explosion occurred that threw wreckage 300 feet (91 m) into the air, followed by two more. The explosion appeared to come from the area of 'B' magazine and was probably caused by one or more high-explosive shells falling from their racks and exploding, then igniting the cordite in the magazine. A piece of armour plate flew 800 yards (730 m) and killed a petty officer on Liverpool. This was the only casualty in connection with the sinking.

== Aftermath ==
Admiral Jellicoe immediately proposed that the sinking be kept a secret, to which the Board of Admiralty and the British Cabinet agreed, an act open to ridicule later on. For the rest of the war, Audacious' name remained on all public lists of ship movements and activities. The many Americans on board Olympic were beyond British jurisdiction and discussed the sinking. Many photos, and even one moving picture, had been taken. By 19 November, the loss of the ship was accepted in Germany. Jellicoe's opposite number in Germany, Reinhard Scheer, wrote after the war, "In the case of the Audacious we approve of the English attitude of not revealing a weakness to the enemy, because accurate information about the other side's strength has a decisive effect on the decisions taken."

On 14 November 1918, shortly after the war ended, a notice officially announcing the loss appeared in The Times:

H.M.S. Audacious.
A Delayed Announcement.

The Secretary of the Admiralty makes the following announcement:—
H.M.S. Audacious sank after striking a mine off the North Irish coast on October 27, 1914.
This was kept secret at the urgent request of the Commander-in-Chief, Grand Fleet, and the Press loyally refrained from giving it any publicity.

A Royal Navy review board judged that a contributory factor in the loss was that Audacious was not at action stations, with water-tight doors locked and damage-control teams ready. Attempts were made to use the engine-circulating pumps as additional bilge pumps, but the rapid rise of water prevented this. Although hatches were open at the time of the explosion, it was claimed that all were closed before rising water reached them. Apart from the damage to the bottom of the ship, water was found to have spread through bulkheads because of faulty seals around pipes and valves, broken pipes and hatches which did not close properly.

Naval historian John Roberts stated that the incident revealed the design flaws in the Royal Navy's damage-control plans for the King George V–class battleships and the other recent dreadnought classes. In the first several classes of dreadnoughts, the engine-circulating pumps had connections to the bilges to allow them to pump water overboard in case of flooding, but these were eliminated as useless in the ships designed after 1907. Furthermore, the ship's auxiliary machinery was almost entirely steam powered, which meant that the steering, hydraulics and primary electrical systems were all disabled as flooding progressed in Audacious.

Two months after the battleship's loss, the Royal Navy ordered that additional bilge pumps and piping connecting the engine-circulating pumps to the bilges be added to all the dreadnoughts of the St Vincent and Indefatigable classes and later. Additional pumps were ordered to be fitted to the submerged torpedo rooms as well as additional valves in the ventilation ducts to limit any flooding. It is uncertain how much of this was actually carried out in the older ships as space was limited as was their availability to get the work done.

The wreck of Audacious was filmed for the television show Deep Wreck Mysteries on the History Channel in 2008. The programme featured an investigation of the wreck and the circumstances of its loss by nautical archaeologist Innes McCartney and naval historian Bill Jurens. The diveable wreck lies upside down at a depth of 58–68 metres (190–223 ft) in clear water at 55°32′16″N 7°24′33″W, some 17 miles (27 km) north-east of Tory Island. 'B' turret and part of its barbette were blown clear of the wreck by the explosion.

== Bibliography ==
- Brown, David K. (1999). The Grand Fleet: Warship Design and Development 1906–1922. Annapolis, Maryland: Naval Institute Press. ISBN 1-55750-315-X.
- Burt, R. A. (2012) [1986]. British Battleships of World War One. Annapolis, Maryland: Naval Institute Press. ISBN 978-1-59114-053-5.
- Colledge, J. J.; Warlow, Ben (2006) [1969]. Ships of the Royal Navy: The Complete Record of All Fighting Ships of the Royal Navy from the 15th Century to the Present (3rd Rev ed.). London: Chatham Publishing. ISBN 978-1-86176-281-8. OCLC 67375475.
- Friedman, Norman (2015). The British Battleship 1906–1946. Barnsley, UK: Seaforth Publishing. ISBN 978-1-84832-225-7.
- Goldrick, James (2015). Before Jutland: The Naval War in Northern European Waters, August 1914 – February 1915. Annapolis, Maryland: Naval Institute Press. ISBN 978-1-59114-349-9.
- Jellicoe, John (1919). The Grand Fleet, 1914–1916: Its Creation, Development, and Work. New York: George H. Doran Company. OCLC 13614571.
- Massie, Robert K. (2003). Castles of Steel: Britain, Germany, and the Winning of the Great War at Sea. New York: Random House. ISBN 0-679-45671-6.
- McCartney, Innes (2016). Jutland 1916: Archaeology of a Naval Battlefield. London: Conway. ISBN 978-1-84486-416-4.
- Parkes, Oscar (1990) [1966]. British Battleships, Warrior 1860 to Vanguard 1950: A History of Design, Construction, and Armament (New & rev. ed.). Annapolis, Maryland: Naval Institute Press. ISBN 1-55750-075-4.
- Pemsel, Helmut (1977). A History of War at Sea: An Atlas and Chronology of Conflict at Sea from Earliest Times to the Present. Annapolis, Maryland: Naval Institute Press. ISBN 0-87021-803-4.
- Preston, Antony (1985). "Great Britain and Empire Forces". In Gray, Randal (ed.). Conway's All the World's Fighting Ships 1906–1921. Annapolis, Maryland: Naval Institute Press. pp. 1–104. ISBN 0-85177-245-5.
- Roberts, John (2023). "A Series of Unfortunate Events: The Loss of HMS Audacious". In Jordan, John (ed.). Warship 2023. Oxford: Osprey Publishing. pp. 8–25. ISBN 978-1-4728-5713-2.
- Scheer, Reinhard (1920). Germany's High Sea Fleet in the World War. London: Cassell and Company. OCLC 973834423.
