= HMS Fermoy =

British naval ship

History

United Kingdom
- Name: HMS Fermoy
- Namesake: Fermoy
- Builder: Dundee Shipbuilding Company
- Launched: 3 February 1919
- Commissioned: July 1919
- Identification: Pennant number: J40 / N40
- Fate: Damaged beyond repair 30 April 1941 by air attack in Malta and broken up

General characteristics
- Class & type: Hunt-class minesweeper, Aberdare sub-class
- Displacement: 800 long tons (813 t)
- Length: 213 ft (65 m) o/a
- Beam: 28 ft 6 in (8.69 m)
- Draught: 7 ft 6 in (2.29 m)
- Installed power: 2 × Yarrow boilers; 2,200 ihp (1,600 kW)
- Propulsion: 2 shafts; 2 vertical triple-expansion steam engines
- Speed: 16 knots (30 km/h; 18 mph)
- Range: 1,500 nmi (2,800 km; 1,700 mi) at 15 knots (28 km/h; 17 mph)
- Complement: 74
- Armament: 1 × QF 4-inch (102 mm) gun; 1 × 76 mm (3.0 in) anti-aircraft gun

HMS Fermoy was a Hunt-class minesweeper of the Aberdare sub-class built for the Royal Navy during World War I. Although she was under construction during the First World War, she was not completed in time to participate in combat operations. In 1941, she was severely damaged by German bombers and was subsequently scrapped.

== Design and description ==
The Aberdare sub-class were enlarged versions of the original Hunt-class ships with a more powerful armament. The ships displaced 800 long tons (810 t) at normal load. They had a length between perpendiculars of 220 feet (67.1 m) and measured 231 feet (70.4 m) long overall. The Aberdares had a beam of 26 feet 6 inches (8.1 m) and a draught of 7 feet 6 inches (2.3 m). The ships' complement consisted of 74 officers and ratings.

The ships had two vertical triple-expansion steam engines, each driving one shaft, using steam provided by two Yarrow boilers. The engines produced a total of 2,200 indicated horsepower (1,600 kW) and gave a maximum speed of 16 knots (30 km/h; 18 mph). They carried a maximum of 185 long tons (188 t) of coal which gave them a range of 1,500 nautical miles (2,800 km; 1,700 mi) at 15 knots (28 km/h; 17 mph).

The Aberdare sub-class was armed with a quick-firing (QF) four-inch (102 mm) gun forward of the bridge and a QF twelve-pounder (76.2 mm) anti-aircraft gun aft. Some ships were fitted with six- or three-pounder guns in lieu of the twelve-pounder.

== Construction and career ==
HMS Fermoy was built by the Dundee Shipbuilding Company. By 1923 she had become the depot ship for the Submarine Periscope School at Portland and on 14 April Hugh Marrack was appointed in command.

She was bombed by Italian aircraft off Valletta, Malta, on 30 April 1941, then on 4 May 1941, and was written off as constructive total loss. She was eventually raised and sold for scrap.

== See also ==
- Fermoy, County Cork, Ireland
