= HMS Liverpool (1909) =

1909 Town-class light cruiser

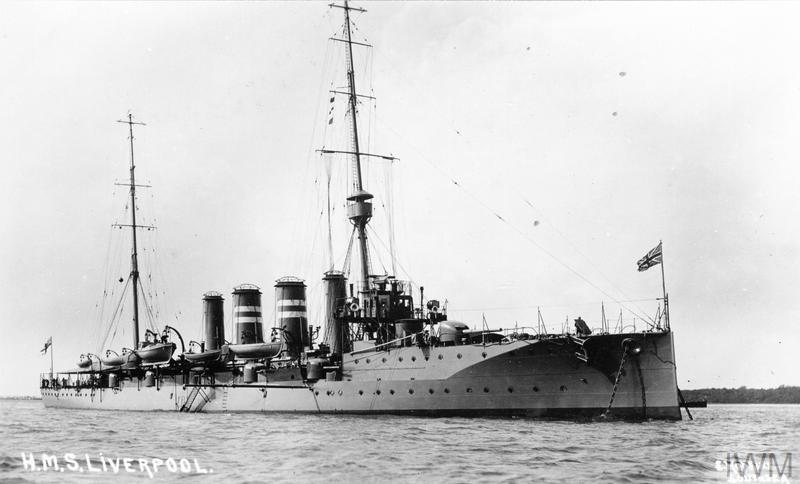
- Liverpool

History

United Kingdom
- Name: Liverpool
- Namesake: Liverpool
- Builder: Vickers Limited
- Laid down: 17 February 1909
- Launched: 30 October 1909
- Commissioned: October 1910
- Fate: Sold for scrap, 8 November 1921

General characteristics
- Class & type: Town-class light cruiser
- Displacement: 4,800 long tons (4,900 t)
- Length: 430 ft (131.1 m) p/p; 453 ft (138.1 m) o/a
- Beam: 47 ft (14.3 m)
- Draught: 15 ft 3 in (4.65 m) (mean)
- Installed power: 12 × Yarrow boilers; 22,000 shp (16,000 kW)
- Propulsion: 4 × shafts; 2 × steam turbines
- Speed: 25 kn (46 km/h; 29 mph)
- Range: 5,830 nmi (10,800 km; 6,710 mi) at 10 knots (19 km/h; 12 mph)
- Complement: 480
- Armament: 2 × single 6 in (152 mm) guns; 10 × single 4 in (102 mm) guns; 4 × 3 pdr (47 mm (1.9 in)) guns; 2 × 18 in (457 mm) torpedo tubes
- Armour: Deck: .75–2 in (19–51 mm); Conning tower: 6 in (150 mm)

HMS Liverpool was a Town-class light cruiser of the Royal Navy commissioned in 1909. Named for the port city of Liverpool, the cruiser served continuously in home waters subordinated to the Home Fleet from 1909 through the initial stages of the First World War.

During the war, Liverpool fought in the Battle of Heligoland Bight, operated off the coast of West Africa, and served in the Adriatic and Aegean. On 27 October 1914, the cruiser assisted in the rescue of the crew of Audacious. Liverpool made efforts to tow the battleship to port, but Audacious eventually capsized and exploded. After the Armistice was signed, Liverpool operated in the Black Sea during the Russian Civil War until placed in reserve in June 1919.

== History ==
=== Grand Fleet (1914–1915) ===
Built by Vickers Sons & Maxim at Barrow-in-Furness, she was the first Liverpool to be named for the port city in the 20th Century and the first to be constructed of steel. Launched on 30 October 1909 and commissioned in 1910, Liverpool was one of five cruisers ordered to the Bristol sub-class specification. The Bristol sub class was the first medium (or 2nd class) cruiser design to be built for the Royal Navy since the late 19th Century. Their main armament consisted of two 6 in (150 mm) and ten 4 in (100 mm) guns — a mixed configuration deemed "unsatisfactory" and discontinued in the subsequent Weymouth sub-class in favour of a uniform complement of eight 6 in (150 mm) guns.

She was assigned to the 1st Battle Squadron of the Home Fleet on commission and transferred to the 2nd Light Cruiser Squadron in 1913. At the beginning of the First World War, Liverpool was serving with the 5th Light Cruiser Squadron. She participated in the first engagement of the war, the Battle of Heligoland Bight, on 28 August 1914 grouped with five other Town cruisers under command of Commodore William Goodenough. After the German cruiser Mainz was heavily damaged and disabled, Goodenough ordered his ships to cease firing on her at 12:55 pm and a rescue operation was subsequently undertaken. Liverpool, accompanied by the destroyers Firedrake and Lurcher, manoeuvred close to the cruiser in an effort to recover the surviving crew. Small craft from Liverpool were deployed to retrieve crewmembers who had abandoned ship while Lurcher positioned alongside Mainz to transfer the remaining personnel on board. Liverpool detached from the main force at 7:45 pm to transport 86 embarked prisoners to Rosyth, including a son of Admiral Alfred von Tirpitz.

Two-months later, on 27 October, Liverpool was in the company of the battleship Audacious when the latter struck a mine during a morning exercise by the Grand Fleet off the coast of Ireland. Unsure of the circumstances of the incident, the Admiralty ordered the fleet to withdraw as a precaution while Liverpool remained as an escort. Audacious attempted to proceed to Lough Swilly but the flooding proved to be grievous. Other vessels, including the liner Olympic, converged on the position after Audacious transmitted an SOS. Repeated attempts to tow the immobile Audacious were ineffectual and the crew was steadily evacuated. The battleship capsized and exploded at 20:45 with the loss of a petty officer on board Liverpool, killed by a scattered piece of armour plate.

=== Adriatic and Aegean (1915–1918) ===
In 1915, Liverpool was detached from the Grand Fleet and sent to patrol the coast of West Africa in support of a search for the armed merchant cruiser Kronprinz Wilhelm. Liverpool's mission was unsuccessful and the cruiser arrived at her namesake port in June for boiler repairs. After the repairs were completed, Liverpool deployed to the Mediterranean in November. She was ported in Brindisi, which functioned as a naval base for Allied warships operating in the Adriatic against Austria-Hungary. The cruiser, in concert with the Italian Pilade Bronzetti, pursued the Austrian destroyer Wildfang in February 1916, but she escaped back to Cattaro. During the Battle of the Otranto Straits, Liverpool was under command of Captain G.H. Vivian and at a reduced state of readiness. Her unpreparedness was compounded by the captain's decision to use the cruiser's reduced state as an opportunity to undergo routine maintenance of the cruiser's boilers. Signals received from Saseno classified as "Urgent" were intercepted at 0350 am and disregarded because Liverpool's wireless room was unable to read Italian and had been the recipient of similar signals previously. Ultimately, Liverpool remained in port and no order was issued by Admiral Alfredo Acton for Liverpool to sail despite the cruiser's eventual readiness and Captain Vivian's personal request.

Liverpool was transferred to the Aegean Squadron in January 1918. Armistices with the Central Powers were signed later that year. With the Black Sea's accessibility restored and the Allies committed to intervention during the Russian Civil War, Liverpool was ordered to the region and engaged in operations supporting the White Army from November. On the 23rd, Liverpool and the French armoured cruiser Ernest Renan, escorted by two Australian destroyers, transported military delegations to the port of Novorossisk to establish contact with Russian General Denikin. She returned to Britain in mid-1919 and was relegated to reserve status in June, berthed at Devonport Dockyard.

Placed on the disposal list in March 1920, Liverpool was sold to Stanlee, then acquired by Slough Trading Company in November 1921 and broken up in Germany. A silver bell and plate were preserved and presented to the Birkenhead-built battleship Rodney. The objects came into the possession of the sixth Liverpool in the late 1930s as gifts following the light cruiser's commission.

== Image gallery ==
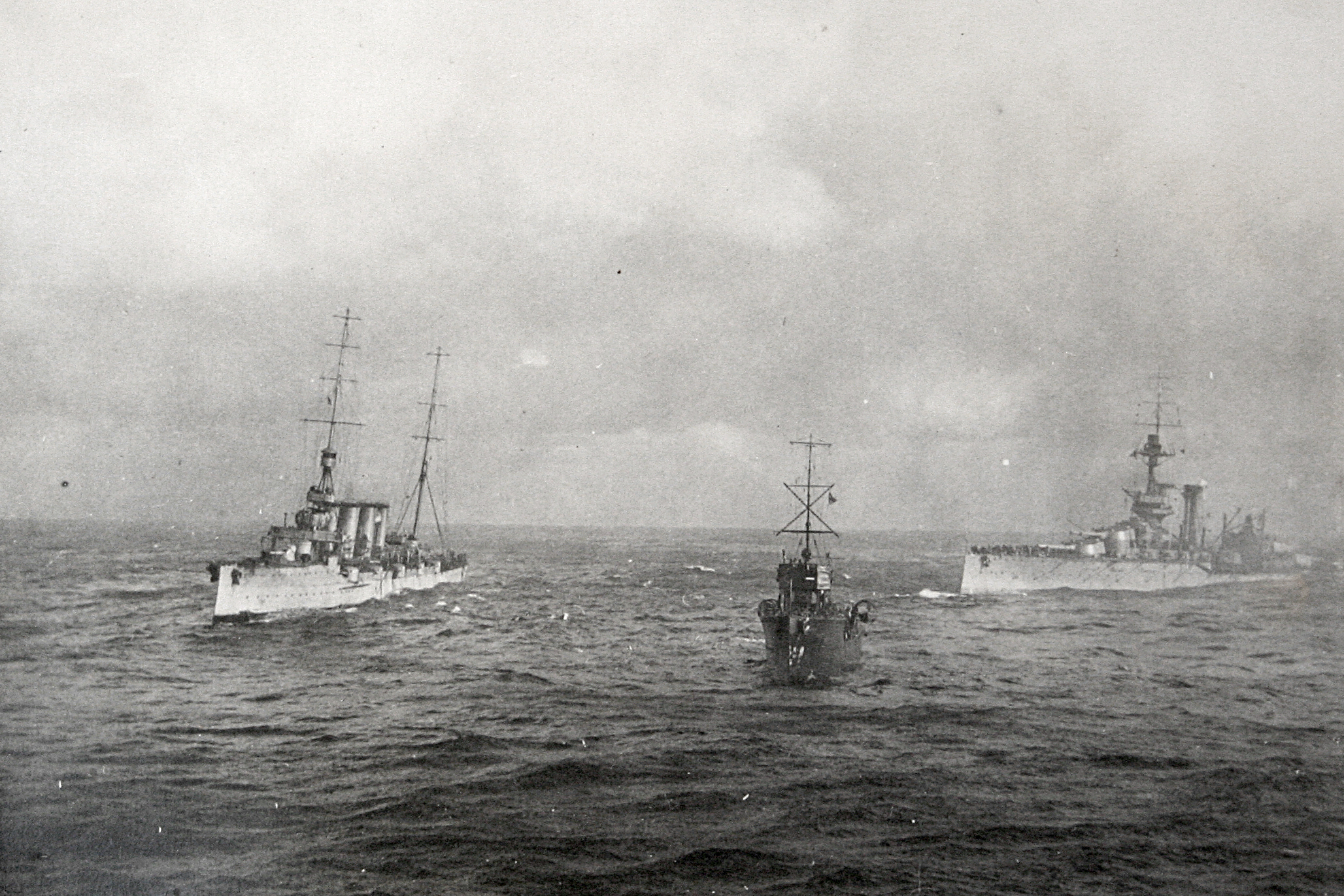
HMS Liverpool and HMS Fury, together with RMS Olympic, try to take HMS Audacious in tow. The view is from the passenger areas of RMS Olympic

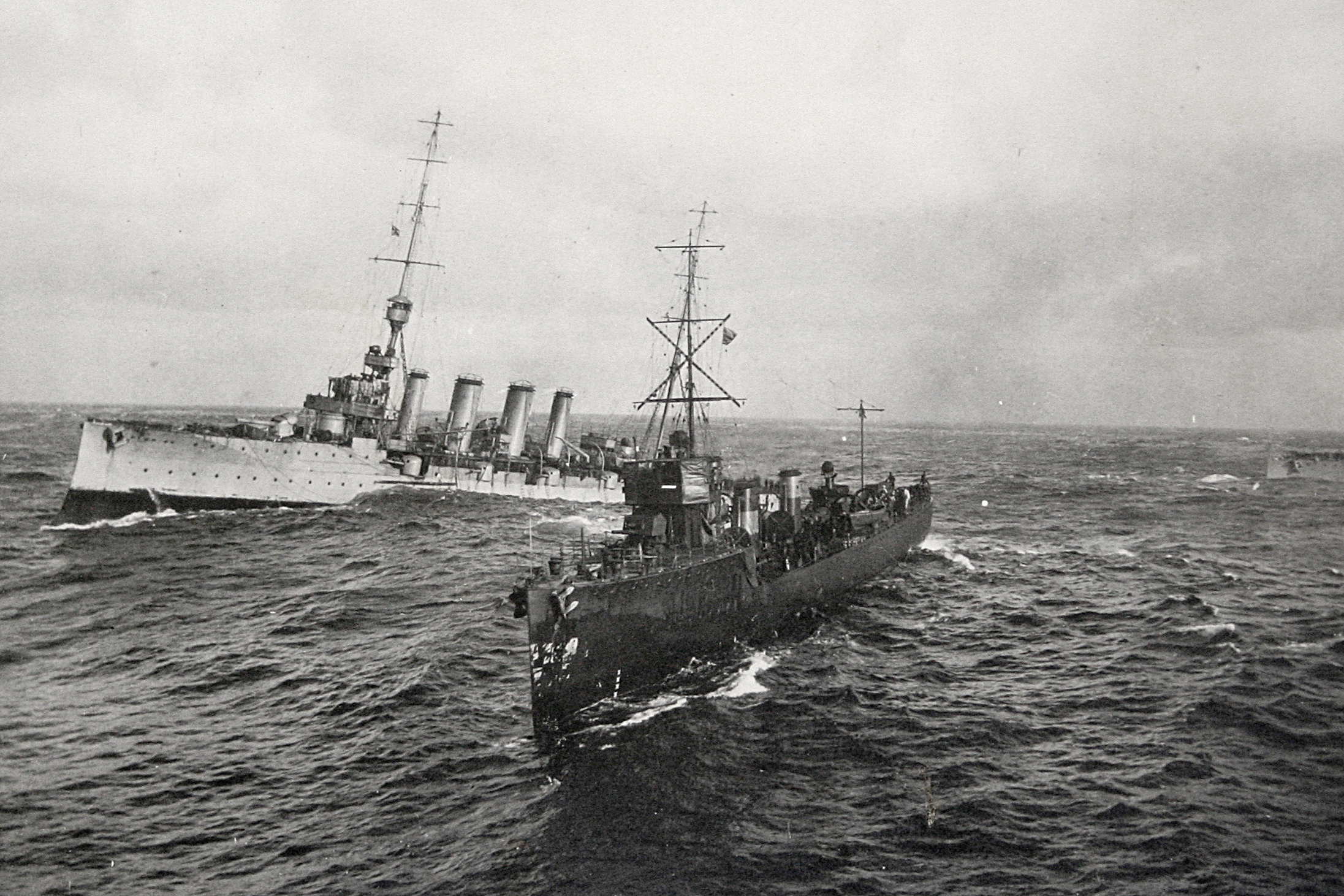
View from the passenger decks of RMS Olympic as HMS Liverpool (left) strains to tow the sinking HMS Audacious (bow seen on right), dated October 26 (sic) 1914.

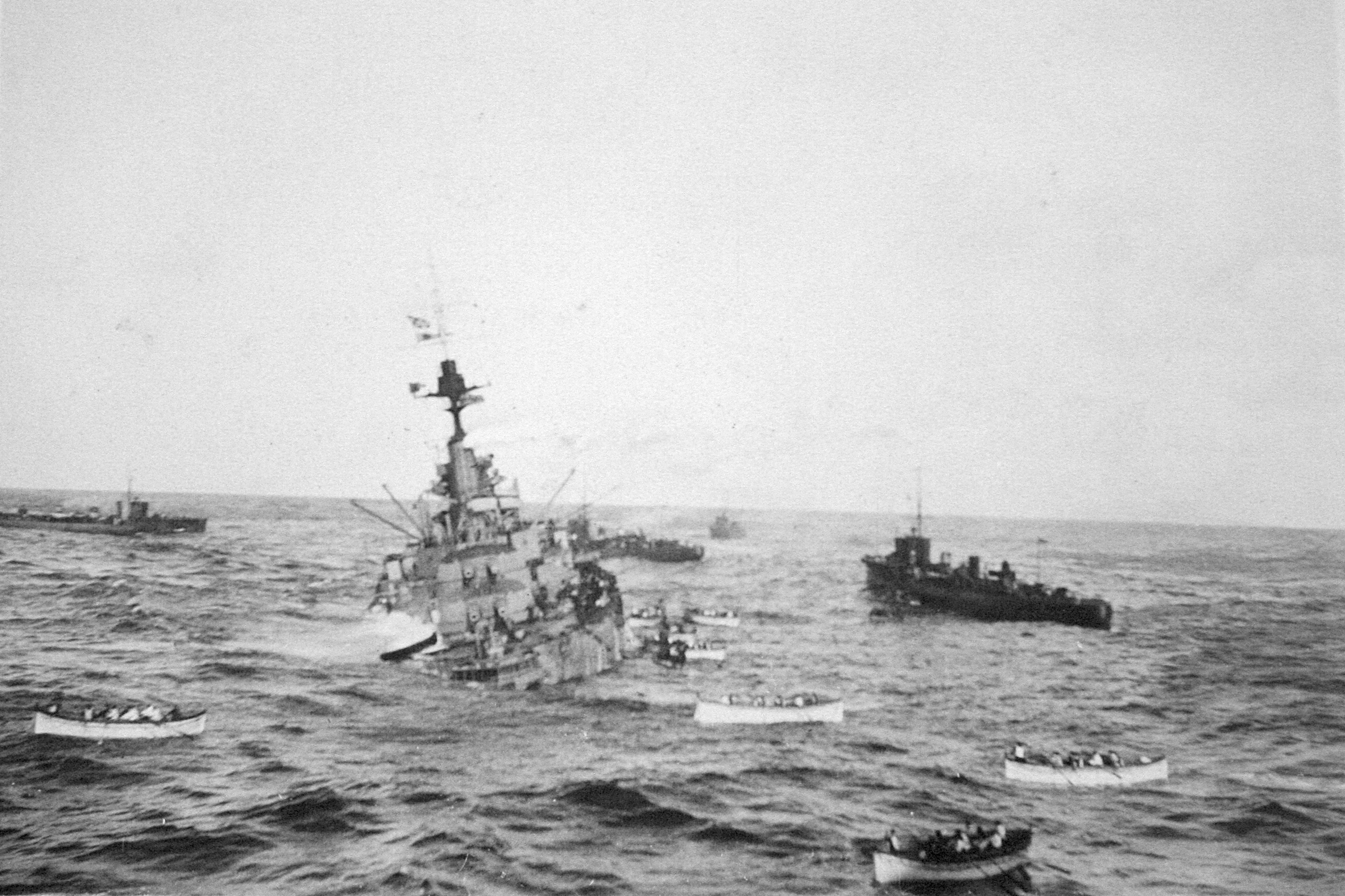
After aborting the attempts to tow, the crew of HMS Audacious take to lifeboats to be taken aboard RMS Olympic. The Olympic passengers and amateur photographers, Edith and Mabel Smith of Derby, dated the event in their album as 26 October (sic) 1914.

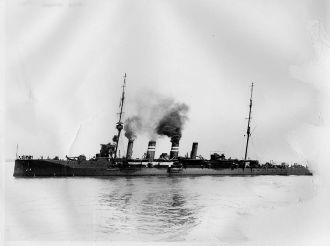
HMS Liverpool (Bristol-class cruiser)
