= J19 (journal) =

J19: The Journal of Nineteenth-Century Americanists
- Discipline: American literature, cultural history
- Language: English
- Edited by: Elizabeth Duquette, Stacey Margolis

Publication details
- History: 2013–present
- Publisher: University of Pennsylvania Press (United States)
- Frequency: Semiannual

Standard abbreviations
- ISO 4: J19

Indexing
- ISSN: 2166-742X (print); 2166-7438 (web)

Links
- Journal homepage

J19: The Journal of Nineteenth-Century Americanists is a semiannual peer-reviewed academic journal which covers research on and analysis of the "long nineteenth century" (1783-1914). It is the official publication of C19: The Society of Nineteenth-Century Americanists. The journal is published by the University of Pennsylvania Press. In addition to the print version, current issues are available electronically through Project MUSE.

The editors-in-chief are Elizabeth Duquette (Gettysburg College) and Stacey Margolis (University of Utah).
