= HMS A9 =

Submarine of the Royal Navy

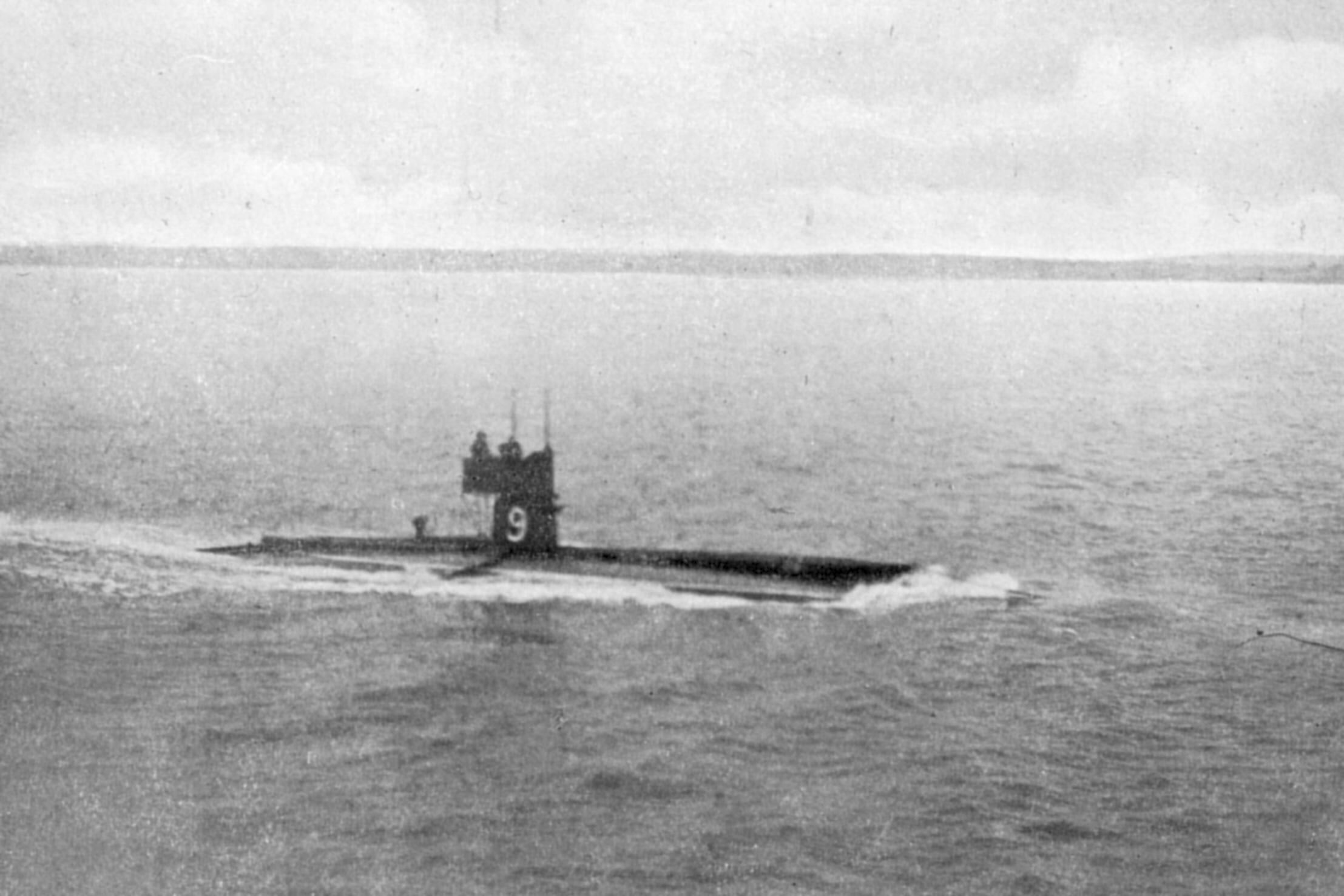
- HMS A9

History

United Kingdom
- Name: A9
- Builder: Vickers, Sons & Maxim Ltd. Barrow-in-Furness
- Laid down: 1903
- Launched: 8 March 1905
- Commissioned: 8 May 1905
- Fate: Sold for scrap, 1920

General characteristics
- Class & type: A-class submarine
- Displacement: 190 long tons (193 t) surfaced; 206 long tons (209 t) submerged
- Length: 105 ft (32.0 m)
- Beam: 12 ft 9 in (3.9 m)
- Draught: 10 ft 8 in (3.3 m)
- Installed power: 600 bhp (450 kW) (petrol engine); 150 hp (110 kW) (electric motor)
- Propulsion: 1 × 16-cylinder Wolseley petrol engine; 1 × electric motor
- Speed: 11 knots (20 km/h; 13 mph) surfaced; 6 knots (11 km/h; 6.9 mph) submerged
- Range: 500 nautical miles (930 km; 580 mi) at 10 kn (19 km/h; 12 mph) surfaced
- Complement: 2 officers and 9 ratings
- Armament: 2 × 18-inch (45 cm) torpedo tubes

HMS A9 was an A-class submarine built for the Royal Navy in the first decade of the 20th century. After surviving World War I, she was sold for scrap in 1920.

== Design and description ==
A9 was a member of the first British class of submarines, although slightly larger, faster and more heavily armed than the lead ship, HMS A1. The submarine had a length of 105 feet 1 inch (32.0 m) overall, a beam of 12 feet 9 inches (3.9 m) and a mean draught of 10 feet 8 inches (3.3 m). They displaced 190 long tons (190 t) on the surface and 206 long tons (209 t) submerged. The A-class submarines had a crew of 2 officers and 9 ratings.

For surface running, the boats were powered by a single 16-cylinder 600-brake-horsepower (447 kW) Wolseley petrol engine that drove one propeller shaft. When submerged the propeller was driven by a 150-horsepower (112 kW) electric motor. They could reach 11 knots (20 km/h; 13 mph) on the surface and 6 knots (11 km/h; 6.9 mph) underwater. On the surface, A9 had a range of 500 nautical miles (930 km; 580 mi) at 10 knots (19 km/h; 12 mph); submerged the boat had a range of 30 nautical miles (56 km; 35 mi) at 5 knots (9.3 km/h; 5.8 mph).

The boats were armed with two 18-inch (45 cm) torpedo tubes in the bow. They could carry a pair of reload torpedoes, but generally did not as doing so that they had to compensate for their weight by an equivalent weight of fuel.

== Construction and career ==
A9 was ordered as part of the 1903–04 Naval Programme from at Vickers. She was laid down at the shipyard in Barrow-in-Furness in 1903, launched on 8 February 1905 and completed on 8 May 1905.

On 15 July 1908, under the command of Lieutenant Clifford Warren, A9 was part of a flotilla of seven Royal Navy submarines making passage from Portland Harbour to Dover accompanied by the Apollo-class cruiser Aeolus. When passing abeam Folkstone it was noticed that A9 was having difficulty keeping station within the formation and assistance was sent from Aeolus. Due to a technical malfunction of a valve a leak of carbon monoxide had occurred within the submarine, which rendered the six-man crew unconscious. Second in command Lieutenant Eric Groves made several attempts to enter the hull and initiate a rescue but was subsequently overcome by the fumes. With the use of wet cloths to cover his face a further attempt was made. This proved to be successful and Lt. Groves managed to cut the fuel supply to the submarine's engines, but in turn also fell unconscious. However, by doing so a rescue party from Aeolus were able to enter the hull and effect the extraction of the sailors, including Lt. Groves who was found slumped over the engine.
