= HMS L71 =

Royal navy submarine

History

United Kingdom
- Name: HMS L71
- Builder: Scotts Shipbuilding and Engineering Company, Greenock
- Laid down: 29 August 1917
- Launched: 17 May 1919
- Commissioned: 23 December 1919
- Fate: Sold for scrapping, 25 March 1938

General characteristics
- Class & type: L-class submarine
- Displacement: 960 long tons (980 t) surfaced; 1,150 long tons (1,170 t) submerged
- Length: 235 ft (71.6 m)
- Beam: 23 ft 6 in (7.2 m)
- Draught: 13 ft 2 in (4.0 m)
- Installed power: 2,400 bhp (1,800 kW) (diesel); 1,600 hp (1,200 kW) (electric)
- Propulsion: 2 × diesel engines; 2 × electric motors
- Speed: 17 kn (31 km/h; 20 mph) surfaced; 10.5 kn (19.4 km/h; 12.1 mph) submerged
- Range: 4,500 nmi (8,300 km; 5,200 mi) at 8 kn (15 km/h; 9.2 mph) on the surface
- Test depth: 150 feet (45.7 m)
- Complement: 44
- Armament: 6 × bow 21 in (533 mm) torpedo tubes; 2 × 4-inch deck guns

HMS L71 was a late-model L-class submarine built for the Royal Navy during the First World War. The boat was not completed before the end of the war and was sold for scrap in 1938.

== Design and description ==
L52 and its successors were modified to maximise the number of 21-inch (53.3 cm) torpedoes carried in the bow. The submarine had a length of 235 feet (71.6 m) overall, a beam of 23 feet 6 inches (7.2 m) and a mean draught of 13 feet 2 inches (4.0 m). They displaced 960 long tons (980 t) on the surface and 1,150 long tons (1,170 t) submerged. The L-class submarines had a crew of 44 officers and ratings. They had a diving depth of 150 feet (45.7 m).

For surface running, the boats were powered by two 12-cylinder Vickers 1,200-brake-horsepower (895 kW) diesel engines, each driving one propeller shaft. When submerged, each propeller was driven by a 600-horsepower (447 kW) electric motor. They could reach 17 knots (31 km/h; 20 mph) on the surface and 10.5 knots (19.4 km/h; 12.1 mph) underwater. On the surface, the L class had a range of 4,200 nautical miles (7,800 km; 4,800 mi) at 10 knots (19 km/h; 12 mph).

The boats were armed with six 21-inch torpedo tubes in the bow. They carried eight reload torpedoes for a grand total of a dozen torpedoes. They were also armed with two 4-inch (102 mm) deck guns.

== Construction and career ==
HMS L71 was laid down on 29 August 1917 by Scotts Shipbuilding and Engineering Company at their Greenock shipyard, launched on 17 May 1919, and completed on 23 January 1920.

On commissioning, L71 joined the 2nd Submarine Flotilla, based at Devonport. The boat was sold for scrap on 25 March 1938 at Milford Haven.
