= British Covenant =

The British Covenant was a protest organised in 1914 against the Third Home Rule Bill for Ireland. It largely mirrored the Ulster Covenant of 1912.

With the failure of Asquith and Bonar Law to reach a compromise on the delayed bill, Law accepted that a compromise was unlikely, and from January 1914 onwards returned to the position that the Unionists were "opposed utterly to Home Rule". The campaign was sufficient to bring the noted organiser Lord Milner back into politics to support the Unionists, and he immediately asked L. S. Amery to write a British Covenant saying that the signers would, if the Home Rule Bill passed,

"feel justified in taking or supporting any action that may be effective to prevent it being put into operation, and more particularly to prevent the armed forces of the Crown being used to deprive the people of Ulster of their rights as citizens of the United Kingdom".

The Covenant was announced at a massive rally in Hyde Park on 4 April 1914, with hundreds of thousands assembling to hear Milner, Long and Carson speak.

The signature campaign was largely organised through the Primrose League and Walter Long's Union Defence League. By the middle of the summer, two million signatures were obtained, together with £12,000 and a pledge to house 5-6,000 women and children.

Signatures included Field-Marshal Lord Roberts, Admiral of the Fleet Sir Edward Seymour, Rudyard Kipling, and Sir William Ramsay FRS.

The Daily Herald condemned the campaign

... the fact that Lords Selbourne and Curzon, to say nothing of Lord Milner, are all members of that treasonous and seditious conspiracy known as the 'British Covenant' in support of armed revolution in Ulster.

The British Covenant coincided with the Larne Gun Running. During the Curragh Incident, Engineer Lieutenant Ranken of HMS Firedrake, as a signatory of the British Covenant, declined to be a party to propelling the ship.
