= John Marrack =

British pathologist

Professor John Richardson Marrack, DSO, MC (26 November 1886 – 1976) was the Emeritus Professor of Chemical Pathology in the University of London, visiting professor to the University of Texas and known for his book Antigens and Antibodies (1934).

== Early life ==
Marrack was born in Clevedon in Somerset and educated at Blundell's School in Tiverton, St John's College, Cambridge, and at the London Hospital Medical College.

Marrack served in the RAMC from 1914 to 1919 and was appointed Medical Officer on Poison Gas to the British Army.

Marrack was a John Lucas Walker Student and a Beir Memorial Fellow at Cambridge University and later a Fellow of St John's College. He received the Distinguished Service Award of the First International Congress of Immunology in 1971. His citation for this award reads: "For revolutionary ideas that have become commonplace in his lifetime, and for pioneering in the physico-chemical interpretation of antigen-antibody interactions".

He was adviser to the Ministry of Food during the Second World War and was instrumental in developing Great Britain's nutrition policy and accurately forecasting the country's post-war nutritional needs.

== Sources ==
- Obituary of Professor J. R. Marrack, The Times, 27 July 1976 (pg. 14; Issue 59766; col F)
