= HMS E51 =

Submarine of the Royal Navy

History

United Kingdom
- Name: E51
- Builder: Scotts, Greenock
- Launched: 30 November 1916
- Commissioned: 27 January 1917
- Fate: Sold, 13 October 1921

General characteristics
- Class & type: E-class submarine
- Displacement: 662 long tons (673 t) surfaced; 807 long tons (820 t) submerged
- Length: 181 ft (55 m)
- Beam: 15 ft (4.6 m)
- Propulsion: 2 × 800 hp (597 kW) diesel; 2 × 420 hp (313 kW) electric; 2 screws
- Speed: 15 knots (28 km/h; 17 mph) surfaced; 10 knots (19 km/h; 12 mph) submerged
- Range: 3,000 nmi (5,600 km) at 10 kn (19 km/h; 12 mph) surfaced; 65 nmi (120 km) at 5 kn (9.3 km/h; 5.8 mph) surfaced
- Complement: 31
- Armament: 5 × 18 inch (450 mm) torpedo tubes (2 bow, 2 beam, 1 stern); 1 × 12-pounder gun

HMS E51 was a British E-class submarine built originally from Yarrow, Scotstoun, but transferred to Scotts, Greenock on 3 March 1915. HMS E51 was launched on 30 November 1916 and commissioned on 27 January 1917. E51 was sold for scrap on 13 October 1921.

== Design ==
Like all post-E8 British E-class submarines, E51 had a displacement of 662 long tons (673 t) at the surface and 807 long tons (820 t) while submerged. She had a total length of 180 feet (55 m) and a beam of 22 feet 8.5 inches (6.922 m). She was powered by two 800 horsepower (600 kW) Vickers eight-cylinder two-stroke diesel engines and two 420 horsepower (310 kW) electric motors. The submarine had a maximum surface speed of 16 knots (30 km/h; 18 mph) and a submerged speed of 10 knots (19 km/h; 12 mph). British E-class submarines had fuel capacities of 50 long tons (51 t) of diesel and ranges of 3,255 miles (5,238 km; 2,829 nmi) when travelling at 10 knots (19 km/h; 12 mph). E51 was capable of operating submerged for five hours when travelling at 5 knots (9.3 km/h; 5.8 mph).

E51 was armed with a 12-pounder 76 mm (3.0 in) QF gun mounted forward of the conning tower. She had five 18 inch (450 mm) torpedo tubes, two in the bow, one either side amidships, and one in the stern; a total of 10 torpedoes were carried.

E-Class submarines had wireless systems with 1 kilowatt (1.3 hp) power ratings; in some submarines, these were later upgraded to 3 kilowatts (4.0 hp) systems by removing a midship torpedo tube. Their maximum design depth was 100 feet (30 m) although in service some reached depths of below 200 feet (61 m). Some submarines contained Fessenden oscillator systems.

== Bibliography ==
- Hutchinson, Robert (2001). Jane's Submarines: War Beneath the Waves from 1776 to the Present Day. London: HarperCollins. ISBN 978-0-00-710558-8. OCLC 53783010.
