= List of ship names of the Royal Navy (C) =

This is a list of Royal Navy ship names starting with C.

== C ==
- C1
- C2
- C3
- C4
- C5
- C6
- C7
- C8
- C9
- C10
- C11
- C12
- C13
- C14
- C15
- C16
- C17
- C18
- C19
- C20
- C21
- C22
- C23
- C24
- C25
- C26
- C27
- C28
- C29
- C30
- C31
- C32
- C33
- C34
- C35
- C36
- C37
- C38
- Ça Ira
- Cabot
- Cacafogo
- Cachalot
- Caddisfly
- Cadiz
- Cadmus
- Caduceus
- Caerleon
- Caesar
- Caesarea
- Caicos
- Cairns
- Cairo
- Caistor Castle
- Calabash
- Calanthe
- Calcutta
- Caldecot Castle
- Calder
- Caldwell
- Caledon
- Caledonia
- Calendula
- Calgarian
- California
- Calista
- Calliope
- Calpe
- Calshot Castle
- Calton
- Calypso
- Calyx
- Cam
- Camberford
- Camberley
- Cambria
- Cambrian
- Cambridge
- Cambridgeshire
- Camel
- Cameleon
- Camelion
- Camellia
- Cameron
- Cameronia
- Camilla
- Camito
- Campania
- Campanula
- Campbell
- Campbeltown
- Campeador V
- Camperdown
- Camphaan
- Campion
- Canada
- Canceaux
- Candytuft
- Canning
- Canopus
- Canso
- Canterburg
- Canterbury
- Canterbury Castle
- Canton
- Cap St Jacques
- Cape Argona
- Cape Chelyuskin
- Cape Comorin
- Cape Finisterre
- Cape Howe
- Cape Passaro
- Cape Sable
- Cape Siretoko
- Cape Spartel
- Cape Warwick
- Cape Wrath
- Capel
- Capelin
- Capetown
- Caprice
- Capricornus
- Captain
- Captivity
- Caradoc
- Caraquet
- Carcass
- Cardiff
- Cardigan Bay
- Cardingham
- Careful
- Carew Castle
- Carhampton
- Caribbean
- Carisbrooke Castle
- Carlisle
- Carlotta
- Carmania
- Carmania II
- Carmen
- Carnarvon
- Carnarvon Bay
- Carnarvon Castle
- Carnatic
- Carnation
- Carolina
- Caroline
- Caronia
- Carrere
- Carrick
- Carrick II
- Carrier
- Carrigaline
- Carrigan Head
- Carron
- Carronade
- Carry On
- Carstairs
- Carthage
- Cartier
- Carysfort
- Cashel
- Cassandra
- Cassius
- Castilian
- Castle
- Castle Harbour
- Castlereagh
- Castleton
- Castor
- Cat
- Catania
- Caterham
- Cathay
- Catherine
- Cato
- Caton
- Catterick
- Cattistock
- Caunton
- Cauvery
- Cavalier
- Cavan
- Cavendish
- Cavina
- Cawsand Bay
- Cawsand
- Cayenne
- Cayman
- Cayton Wyke
- Ceanothus
- Cedric
- Celandine
- Celebes
- Celerity
- Celia
- Celt
- Celtic
- Censeur
- Censor
- Centaur
- Centurion
- Cephalus
- Cerbere
- Cerberus
- Ceres
- Cerf
- Cesar
- Cessnock
- Ceto
- Ceto II
- Ceylon
- Chailey
- Chakdina
- Chakla
- Challenger
- Chameleon
- Chamois
- Champion
- Chance
- Changuinola
- Chantala
- Chanticleer
- Chaplet
- Charde
- Charger
- Charity
- Charles
- Charles Boyes
- Charles II
- Charles V
- Charles and Henry
- Charles Galley
- Charlestown
- Charlock
- Charlotte
- Charon
- Charwell
- Charybdis
- Chaser
- Chasseur
- Chatham
- Chatham Double
- Chatham Hulk
- Chatham Prize
- Chatsgrove
- Chawton
- Cheam
- Chediston
- Cheerful
- Cheerly
- Chelmer
- Chelmsford
- Chelsea
- Chelsham
- Cheltenham
- Chengteh
- Chepstow Castle
- Chepstow
- Chequers
- Cheriton
- Cherokee
- Cherub
- Charwell
- Cherwell
- Chesapeake
- Cheshire
- Chester
- Chester Castle
- Chesterfield
- Chestnut
- Cheviot
- Chevreuil
- Chevron
- Chichester
- Chiddingfold
- Chieftain
- Chilcompton
- Childers
- Childs Play
- Chillingham
- Chilton
- China
- Chippeway
- Chitral
- Chivalrous
- Cholmondeley
- Christ
- Christchurch Castle
- Christian VII
- Christine Rose
- Christopher
- Christopher Spayne
- Christopher Wren
- Chrysanthemum
- Chub
- Chubb
- Church
- Churchill
- Cicala
- Cicero
- Cilicia
- Circassia
- Circassian
- Circe
- Citadel
- City of Belfast
- City of Durban
- City of Edinburgh II
- City of London
- City of Rochester
- Clacton
- Clan MacNaughton
- Clara
- Clarbeston
- Clare
- Clare Castle
- Clarence
- Clarkia
- Claudia
- Claverhouse
- Clavering Castle
- Claymore
- Cleethorpes
- Clematis
- Clementina
- Cleopatra
- Cleveland
- Clifton
- Clinker
- Clinton
- Clio
- Clitheroe Castle
- Clive
- Clonmel
- Clorinde
- Clove Tree
- Clovelly
- Cloughton Wyke
- Clover
- Clown
- Clun Castle
- Clyde
- Clydebank
- Cobbers
- Cobham
- Cobra
- Cochin
- Cochrane
- Cockade
- Cockatrice
- Cockburn
- Cockchafer
- Cocker
- Cocksedge
- Codrington
- Colchester
- Colchester Castle
- Colibri
- Colleen
- Collingwood
- Collinson
- Colne
- Colombe
- Colombo
- Colossus
- Coltsfoot
- Columbella
- Columbia
- Columbine
- Colwyn
- Combatant
- Combustion
- Comeet
- Comet
- Comet I
- Comfrey
- Commandant Domine
- Commandant Duboc
- Commander Holbrook
- Commerce de Marseille
- Commonwealth
- Comorin
- Comus
- Conception
- Concord
- Concorde
- Condor
- Confederate
- Confiance
- Conflagration
- Conflict
- Confounder
- Congo
- Coniston
- Conn
- Conquerant
- Conquerante
- Conqueror
- Conqueror II
- Conquest
- Conquestador
- Conquistador
- Consort
- Constance
- Constant
- Constant John
- Constant Reformation
- Constant Warwick
- Constitution
- Contender
- Content
- Contest
- Convert
- Convertine
- Convolvulus
- Convulsion
- Conway
- Cook
- Cooke
- Coote
- Copenhagen
- Coquette
- Coquille
- Corbrae
- Corburn
- Cordelia
- Coreopsis
- Corfe Castle
- Corfield
- Corfu
- Coriander
- Corinthian
- Cormorant
- Cornel
- Cornelia
- Cornelian
- Cornet Castle
- Cornflower
- Cornwall
- Cornwallis
- Coromandel
- Coronado
- Coronation
- Corso
- Corunna
- Corycia
- Cosby
- Cossack
- Cotillion
- Cotswold
- Cottesmore
- Cotton
- Coucy
- Counterguard
- Countess of Carinthia
- Countess of Hopetoun
- Countess of Scarborough
- Courageous
- Courageux
- Courbet
- Coureur
- Coureuse
- Courier
- Courser
- Coventry
- Covina
- Cowdray
- Cowes Castle
- Cowling Castle
- Cowper
- Cowslip
- Craccher
- Crache-Feu
- Cracker
- Cradley
- Crafty
- Craigie
- Crane
- Cranefly
- Cranham
- Cranstoun
- Crash
- Craufurd
- Crediton
- Creole
- Crescent
- Cressy
- Crested Eagle
- Crestflower
- Cretan
- Criccieth Castle
- Crichton
- Cricket
- Crispin
- Crocodile
- Crocus
- Crofton
- Cromarty
- Cromer
- Cromer Castle
- Cromwell
- Croome
- Crossbow
- Crow
- Crown
- Crown Malago
- Crown Prize
- Croxton
- Crozier
- Croziers
- Cruelle
- Cruiser
- Cruizer
- Crusader
- Crystal
- Cuba
- Cubitt
- Cuckmere
- Cuckoo
- Cuffley
- Cullin Sound
- Culloden
- Culver
- Culverin
- Cumberland
- Cupar
- Cupid
- Curacoa
- Curieux
- Curlew
- Curragh
- Curzon
- Cutlass
- Cutter
- Cuttle
- Cuxton
- Cyane
- Cybele
- Cyclamen
- Cyclops
- Cydnus
- Cygnet
- Cymric
- Cynthia
- Cyrene
- Cyrus
- Czarevitch

== See also ==
- List of aircraft carriers of the Royal Navy
- List of amphibious warfare ships of the Royal Navy
- List of pre-dreadnought battleships of the Royal Navy
- List of dreadnought battleships of the Royal Navy
- List of battlecruisers of the Royal Navy
- List of cruiser classes of the Royal Navy
- List of destroyer classes of the Royal Navy
- List of patrol vessels of the Royal Navy
- List of frigate classes of the Royal Navy
- List of monitors of the Royal Navy
- List of mine countermeasure vessels of the Royal Navy (includes minesweepers and mine hunters)
- List of Royal Fleet Auxiliary ship names
- List of submarines of the Royal Navy
- List of survey vessels of the Royal Navy
- List of Royal Navy shore establishments
