= Carysfort =

Carysfort can refer to:

- Carysfort, County Wicklow former borough now called Macreddin
  - Carysfort (Parliament of Ireland constituency)
- Earl of Carysfort, and Baron Carysfort, Irish peerage of the Proby family
- Carysfort Reef, Florida Keys
  - Carysfort Reef Light
- Carysfort Island, a name for Tureia
- Cape Carysfort, East Falkland island
- HMS Carysfort, five ships of the Royal Navy
- Carysfort College former teacher training college in Dublin
