= Cotswold (disambiguation) =

The Cotswolds is a region of central South West England.

Cotswold or Cotswolds may also refer to:

== Places ==
=== England ===
- Cotswold District, a local government district in Gloucestershire
- The Cotswolds (European Parliament constituency), 1979–1999
- The Cotswolds (UK Parliament constituency), 1997–2024

=== Elsewhere ===
- Cotswold, Ontario, a small community in Wellington County, Ontario, Canada
- Cotswold Hills, Queensland, residential area in Toowamba, Australia
- Cotswold (Charlotte neighborhood), a neighborhood in Charlotte, North Carolina, US

== Arts, entertainment and events ==
- The Cotswolds, a symphony by Gustav Holst

== Transportation ==
- HMS Cotswold, a British Hunt-Class minesweeper

== Other uses ==
- Cotswold architecture, architectural design style similar to Cotswold cottages
- Cotswold sheep, a breed noted for its wool
