= List of shipwrecks in February 1869 =

The list of shipwrecks in February 1869 includes ships sunk, foundered, grounded, or otherwise lost during February 1869.

== 1 February ==
List of shipwrecks: 1 February 1869
Ship	State	Description
Aden	United Kingdom	The ship collided with an American ship and was abandoned in the Atlantic Ocean. Her crew were rescued by War Spite (United Kingdom). Aden was on a voyage from Darien, Georgia, United States to Amsterdam, North Holland, Netherlands.
Alarm	United Kingdom	The barque was driven ashore in the Nieuw Diep.
Amalie	Netherlands	The brig was driven ashore at Portland, Dorset, United Kingdom with the loss of two of her ten crew. Survivors were rescued by rocket apparatus. She was on a voyage from Havre de Grâce, Seine-Inférieure to Saint Thomas, Virgin Islands.
Bellona	United Kingdom	The brig was run ashore in a sinking condition at Aberdaron, Caernarfonshire. Her crew were rescued She was on a voyage from Newport, Monmouthshire to Buenos Aires, Argentina.
Cinco Hermanos	Spain	The ship was wrecked at Cape de Mar, near Vigo. Her crew were rescued. She was on a voyage from Liverpool, Lancashire, United Kingdom to Manila, Spanish East Indies.
Demitrius	United Kingdom	The steamship was damaged by fire at Liverpool.
Hermina Vos	Flag unknown	The ship sank off Lundy Island, Devon, United Kingdom.
Horace C. Bell	United Kingdom	The schooner was wrecked on the Corton Sand, in the North Sea off the coast of Suffolk and was abandoned by her crew. The Lowestoft Lifeboat Lætitia ( Royal National Lifeboat Institution) rescued the ship's cat and dog. Horace C. Bell was on a voyage from Fécamp, Seine-Inférieure, France to Great Yarmouth, Norfolk.
Lady Westmoreland	United Kingdom	The steamship was driven ashore on Hayling Island, Hampshire. She was on a voyage from South Shields, County Durham to Cartagena, Spain. She was refloated with assistance from the Hayling Lifeboat and taken in to St. Helen's, Isle of Wight in a leaky condition.
Louis Amédée	France	The brig was abandoned in the Atlantic Ocean 15 nautical miles (28 km) west of the Isles of Scilly, United Kingdom. Her crew were rescued by the barque Mimer (Norway). Louis Amédée was boarded by the crews of two pilot cutters and it was found that an attempt had been made to scuttle her. She was run ashore at St. Mary's, Isles of Scilly.
Maria	Prussia	The ship was abandoned in the Atlantic Ocean. Her crew were rescued by Flying Fish (United Kingdom). Maria was on a voyage from Runcorn, Cheshire, United Kingdom to Cette, Hérault, France.
Matrona	United Kingdom	The ship ran aground on the Fort Caswell Rip. She was on a voyage from Wilmington, Delaware, United States to London.
Sarah Ann	United Kingdom	The ship was driven ashore at Douglas, Isle of Man. Her crew were rescued.
Vulcan	United Kingdom	The ship was wrecked near the "Isle of Ross".
Unnamed	United Kingdom	The ship was wrecked on the Isle of Arran.

== 2 February ==
List of shipwrecks: 2 February 1869
Ship	State	Description
Agouhanna, or L. Agonhama	United Kingdom	The ship was destroyed by fire 70 nautical miles (130 km) south of Bombay, India. She was on a voyage from Liverpool, Lancashire to Bombay.
Charlemagne	United Kingdom	The brig was driven ashore south of Warkworth, Northumberland.
Courant	Prussia	The schooner was wrecked on Molène Finistère, France with the loss of her captain. Six crew were rescued. She was on a voyage from Marseille, Bouches-du-Rhône, France to King's Lynn, Norfolk, United Kingdom.
Emerald	United Kingdom	The barque ran aground on the Holms, in the Humber. She was on a voyage from Alexandria, Egypt to Hull, Yorkshire.
General McPherson	United States	The steamship collided with Duke of Edinburgh (United Kingdom) and was severely damaged.
Sker	United Kingdom	The schooner was driven ashore at Dublin.
West	United Kingdom	The full-rigged ship departed from New York, United States for Liverpool. No further trace, presumed foundered with the loss of all hands.

== 3 February ==
List of shipwrecks: 3 February 1869
Ship	State	Description
Agenoria	United Kingdom	The schooner was wrecked on the Batten Reef. She was on a voyage from Cardiff, Glamorgan to Plymouth, Devon.
Bankside	United Kingdom	The ship ran aground in the River Tees and was severely damaged. She was on a voyage from Middlesbrough, Yorkshire to Adelaide, South Australia. She was refloated and put back to Middlesbrough.
Cambrian	United Kingdom	The barque was driven ashore and wrecked at Whitburn, County Durham. She was on a voyage from Dover, Kent to Sunderland, County Durham. She was refloated on 5 February and towed in to Sunderland, where she sank. She was refloated on 10 February.
City of Rio de Janeiro	United Kingdom	The steamship was driven ashore at Dunnose, Isle of Wight. She was on a voyage from Antwerp, Belgium to Falmouth, Cornwall. She was refloated and resumed her voyage.
Jefferson Davis	United Kingdom	The ship was wrecked. Her crew were rescued by Albert (United Kingdom).
Royal Arch	(United Kingdom of Great Britain and Ireland) Guernsey	The ship ran aground on the Nore. She was on a voyage from Guernsey to London.
Terrier	United Kingdom	The steamship struck the Trow Rocks, on the coast of County Durham and sank. Her crew were rescued.
Undine	United States	The barque was wrecked on Gun Cay, Bahamas. She was on a voyage from Cienfuegos, Cuba to Boston, Massachusetts.
William	United Kingdom	The schooner was wrecked near the Llandwyn Island Lighthouse, Anglesey. Her crew were rescued. She was on a voyage from "Llanhairn" to Runcorn, Cheshire.

== 4 February ==
List of shipwrecks: 4 February 1869
Ship	State	Description
Brothers	United Kingdom	The brig was driven ashore at Stornoway, Isle of Lewis, Outer Hebrides. She was on a voyage from Liverpool, Lancashire to Aberdeen.
Chase	United Kingdom	The ship was driven ashore and wrecked at Hornsea, Yorkshire.
Comet	United Kingdom	The ship ran aground on the Arklow Bank, in the Irish Sea off the coast of County Wicklow. She was on a voyage from Dublin to Cardiff, Glamorgan. She was refloated and put in to Kingstown, County Dublin in a leaky condition.
Friends	United Kingdom	The schooner was driven ashore at Margate, Kent, England, in a storm.
John Bright	United Kingdom	The barque was wrecked in Nootka Sound with the loss of all hands.
King John	United Kingdom	The barque ran aground on the Longsand, in the North Sea off the coast of Essex.
Othello	United Kingdom	The ship foundered in the Atlantic Ocean. Her crew were rescued by Magic (United Kingdom). Othello was on a voyage from the Clyde to Saint John's, Newfoundland Colony.
Rypen	Norway	The ship departed from Queenstown, County Cork, United Kingdom for Dover, Kent. She subsequently capsized with the loss of all hands. The wreck was taken in to St. Ives Bay, Cornwall in mid-May.
Simcoe	United Kingdom	The ship ran aground and sank in Carnarvon Bay. Her crew were rescued by a schooner. She was on her maiden voyage.
Victory	United Kingdom	The ship ran aground on the Cross Sand. She was on a voyage from Liverpool to Bermuda. She was refloated and assisted in to Ramsgate, Kent in a leaky condition.
Vier Gezusters	United Kingdom	The ship was driven ashore at Brouwershaven, Zeeland. She was on a voyage from Java, Netherlands East Indies to a Dutch port.

== 5 February ==
List of shipwrecks: 5 February 1869
Ship	State	Description
Formosa	(United Kingdom of Great Britain and Ireland) Victoria	The steamship was wrecked at the Port Phillip Heads. All eleven people on board were rescued. She was on a voyage from the Clyde to Melbourne.
Garibaldi	United Kingdom	The ship was driven ashore and wrecked at Bondicar, Northumberland. Her crew survived. She was on a voyage from Kirkwall, Orkney Islands to North Sunderland, County Durham.
George Elliot	United Kingdom	The steamship was wrecked near Viveiro, Spain. Her nine crew survived. She was on a voyage from South Shields, County Durham to Naples, Italy.
Henry and Dora	United Kingdom	The brigantine was wrecked at Portland, Dorset. She was on a voyage from Trouville-sur-Mer, Calvados, France to Llanelly, Glamorgan.
Jane	United Kingdom	The schooner was destroyed by fire off Stonehaven, Aberdeenshire. Her crew survived. She was on a voyage from Sunderland, County Durham to Fraserburgh, Aberdeenshire.
Louisa	United Kingdom	The brigantine ran aground on the Maplin Sand, in the North Sea off the coast of Essex.
Samuel	United Kingdom	The ship was wrecked at Cape Finisterre, Spain. Her crew were rescued. She was on a voyage from Newcastle upon Tyne, Northumberland to a Mediterranean port.
Virginia	France	The brig was wrecked at Langness, Isle of Man with the loss of eight of her ten crew. She was on a voyage from Liverpool, Lancashire, United Kingdom to Buenos Aires, Argentina.

== 6 February ==
List of shipwrecks: 6 February 1869
Ship	State	Description
Bee	United Kingdom	The schooner was driven ashore at Campbeltown, Argyllshire.
Calcutta, and Emma	United Kingdom; Prussia	The barque Emma was run into by the full-rigged ship Calcutta and sank in the Atlantic Ocean 180 nautical miles (330 km) west of the Isles of Scilly with the loss of seven of her eleven crew. She was on a voyage from Cardiff, Glamorgan to Barcelona, Spain. Calcutta was abandoned with the loss of ten of her 69 crew. Eight crew were rescued by the Cadgwith Lifeboat. She was on a voyage from London to Bombay, India. Holed at the bow, she was towed in to Plymouth, Devon by HMS Terrible (Royal Navy) on 10 February.
Comton	United Kingdom	The ship foundered 8 nautical miles (15 km) north west of the Isle of May, Fife. Her four crew were rescued. She was on a voyage from Queensferry to Hartlepool, County Durham.
Ellen	United Kingdom	The ship was run into by a barque and sank in the North Sea 85 nautical miles (157 km) off Great Yarmouth, Norfolk. Her crew were rescued.
English Rose	United Kingdom	The ship ran aground on the Maplin Sand, in the North Sea off the coast of Essex and was abandoned by her crew.
Esther and Mary	United Kingdom	The schooner was driven ashore at Groomsport, County Down. She was on a voyage from Larne, County Antrim to Workington, Cumberland. She was refloated and towed in to Belfast, County Antrim.
Germania, and Horsa	Hamburg; Denmark	The steamship Horsa ran into Germania at Leith, Lothian, United Kingdom. Both vessels were severely damaged.
May Flower	United Kingdom	The brig ran aground on the Maplin Sand. She was refloated on 12 February and towed in to Southend, Essex.
Otto	Stralsund	The ship driven ashore at "Ancona". Her crew were rescued. She was on a voyage from Newcastle upon Tyne, Northumberland to Stralsund.
Pallas	Prussia	The schooner was driven ashore and scuttled at Ballywalter, County Antrim. She was on a voyage from Belfast to Liverpool, Lancashire, United Kingdom.

== 7 February ==
List of shipwrecks: 7 February 1869
Ship	State	Description
George Thomas	United Kingdom	The schooner was run down and sunk off the Eddystone Lighthouse, Cornwall by the steamship Thames with the loss of two of her crew.
Hector	United Kingdom	The brig ran aground off Shoeburyness, Essex and was damaged.
Wave	United Kingdom	The ship ran aground on the Gunfleet Sand, in the North Sea off the coast of Suffolk. She was on a voyage from Rouen, Seine-Inférieure, France to Burnham-on-Crouch, Essex. She was refloated and taken in to Harwich, Essex in a severely leaky condition.

== 8 February ==
List of shipwrecks: 8 February 1869
Ship	State	Description
Admiral de Winter	Netherlands	The ship was sighted in the Indian Ocean whilst on a voyage from Banjoewangi, Netherlands East Indies to Rotterdam, South Holland. No further trace, presumed foundered with the loss of all hands.
Etherley	United Kingdom	The ship was run down by a brig off Whitby, Yorkshire. Her crew were rescued by George and Mary (United Kingdom).
Excelsior	United Kingdom	The schooner was wrecked on São Miguel Island, Azores. She was on a voyage from São Miguel Island to London.
Isabella Granger	United Kingdom	The ship ran aground on the Corton Sand, in the North Sea off the coast of Suffolk. She was on a voyage from Whitby, Yorkshire to Rochester, Kent. She was refloated and assisted in to Lowestoft, Suffolk in a leaky condition and sank there.
Ophor	Denmark	The ship was driven ashore and wrecked at Thyborøn with the loss of a crew member. She was on a voyage from Newcastle upon Tyne, Northumberland, United Kingdom to Copenhagen.
Persian	United Kingdom	The ship was driven ashore on Norderney, Prussia. Her crew were rescued. She was on a voyage from Savannah, Georgia to Bremen.
Robert Bruce	United Kingdom	The brig was driven ashore and wrecked at Maryport, Cumberland. Her nine crew were rescued by the Maryport Lifeboat Henry Nixon ( Royal National Lifeboat Institution). Robert Bruce was on a voyage from Maryport to Belfast, County Antrim.
Selina Kemp	United Kingdom	The barque was driven ashore 2 nautical miles (3.7 km) south of Dunwich, Suffolk. Her crew were rescued. She was on a voyage from South Shields, County Durham to Plymouth, Devon.
Sicilia, or Silicia	United Kingdom	The barque was driven ashore at Dunwich. Her crew were rescued.
Stella	Bremen	The barque collided with a British steamship and foundered in the Atlantic Ocean (44°42′N 9°40′W). Her crew were rescued.

== 9 February ==
List of shipwrecks: 9 February 1869
Ship	State	Description
Atlas	United Kingdom	The brigantine was run down and sunk by a steamship off the coast of Suffolk. One of her six crew was rescued by the steamship, the rest by Marys (United Kingdom).
Blenheim	United Kingdom	The barque caught fire and sank 50 nautical miles (93 km) south east of Cape St. Vincent, Portugal (25°21′N 7°40′W). She was on a voyage from North Shields, Northumberland to Genoa, Italy.
Indian Warrior	United Kingdom	The ship ran aground off Hainan, China.

== 10 February ==
List of shipwrecks: 10 February 1869
Ship	State	Description
Gorleston	United Kingdom	The yawl was run into by Wilson (United Kingdom) and was run ashore at Great Yarmouth Norfolk in a sinking condition.

== 11 February ==
List of shipwrecks: 11 February 1869
Ship	State	Description
Home	United Kingdom	The brig foundered at sea. Her crew were rescued by Sarah Ann (United Kingdom). Home was on a voyage from Cardiff, Glamorgan to A Coruña, Spain.
Neptun	Prussia	The barque foundered 20 nautical miles (37 km) north west of the Isles of Scilly, United Kingdom#. Her crew were rescued by Odin ( Rostock). Neptun was on a voyage from New York, United States to Liverpool, Lancashire, United Kingdom. She came ashore at Garnett's Head, Cornwall and was wrecked.

== 12 February ==
List of shipwrecks: 12 February 1869
Ship	State	Description
Alpha	United Kingdom	The brig was driven ashore at Lowestoft, Suffolk. Her crew were rescued by a yawl. She was on a voyage from Sunderland, County Durham to the Charente. She was refloated on 14 February and taken in to Lowestoft.
Argo	United Kingdom	The ship was driven ashore and wrecked at Lowestoft. Her seven crew were rescued by rocket apparatus. She was on a voyage from South Shields, County Durham to London.
City of Carlisle	United Kingdom	The barque was wrecked on the Kentish Knock. Her 23 crew were rescued by the smacks Aurora's Increase and Ranger (both United Kingdom). City of Carlisle was on a voyage from South Shields to Aden.
Garibaldi	United Kingdom	The schooner was driven ashore and wrecked 880 yards (800 m) west of Beachy Head, Sussex. Her six crew survived. She was on a voyage from Swansea, Glamorgan to London.
Geiser	Denmark	The schooner was driven ashore at Margate. Her crew were rescued by the Coastguard and/or the Margate Lifeboat Quiver ( Royal National Lifeboat Institution). She was consequently condemned.
George	United Kingdom	The brig was wrecked on the Foreness Rock, Margate with the loss of all hands.
Hebe	United Kingdom	The schooner was driven ashore at Lowestoft. Her five crew were rescued but the ship's dog drowned. She was on a voyage from South Shields to Plymouth, Devon. She was refloated on 14 February and taken in to Lowestoft.
Highland Chief	United Kingdom	The barque was wrecked on the Goodwin Sands, Kent with the loss of two of her crew. Five crew took to a boat; they were reported missing. The rest were rescued by the Ramsgate Lifeboat Bradford ( Royal National Lifeboat Institution). Highland Chief was on a voyage from South Shields to Cartagena, Spain.
Josephine Marie	France	The schooner was driven ashore at Corton, Suffolk. She was on a voyage from Hull, Yorkshire, United Kingdom to Bordeaux, Gironde. She was refloated on 15 February and towed in to Lowestoft in a leaky condition.
Leeds	United Kingdom	The schooner was driven ashore at Corton. Her crew were rescued by the Coastguard using rocket apparatus. She was on a voyage from Goole, Yorkshire to London.
Luna	United Kingdom	The Yorkshire Billyboy was wrecked on the Haisborough Sands, in the North Sea off the coast of Norfolk. Her three crew were rescued by the schooner Adriana Wilhelmina (Netherlands). Luna was on a voyage from Keadby, Lincolnshire to London.
Mary and Elizabeth	United Kingdom	The ship was driven ashore at Port Talbot, Glamorgan. She was on a voyage from Swansea to Port Talbot.
Morning Star	United Kingdom	The brigantine collided with the schooner Emma (United Kingdom) and sank off the North Foreland, Kent. Her crew were rescued by Emma. Morning Star was on a voyage from Newcastle upon Tyne, Northumberland to Naples, Italy.
Nicholson	United Kingdom	The ship collided with Frank Shaw off the North Foreland. Three of her crew got on board Frank Shaw. No further trace of Nicholson.
Perseverance	United Kingdom	The schooner was driven onto the Walpuls Rocks, on the coast of Kent and was wrecked. Her crew were rescued. She was on a voyage from Hartlepool, County Durham to Dover, Kent.
Perseverance	United Kingdom	The schooner collided with Ark (United Kingdom and sank off the Kent coast. Her crew, and a crew member of Ark, who had gone aboard following the collision, were rescued by the smack Mary Anne (United Kingdom). Perseverance was on a voyage from Burntisland, Fife to Dover.
Providence	United Kingdom	The brig was driven ashore at Corton with the loss of five of her eleven crew. She was on a voyage from South Shields to Cartagena, Spain. She was refloated on 19 February and taken in to Lowestoft.
St. Day	United Kingdom	The ship collided with a brigantine and another vessel and sank in The Downs. She was on a voyage from London to Penryn, Cornwall.
Stuart	United Kingdom	The smack collided with Thomas and William (United Kingdom) and a French vessel and sank off the North Forelandwith the loss of three of her six crew. Survivors were rescued by Thomas and William.
Sunderland	United Kingdom	The steamship ran aground on the Sizewell Bank, in the North Sea off the coast of Suffolk. She was refloated and resumed her voyage.
Tavistock	United Kingdom	The schooner collided with another schooner and with Tauroa (United Kingdom) and was abandoned off Broadstairs, Kent. Her crew were rescued by Tauroa. Tavistock was subsequently towed in to Ramsgate by the Ramsgate Lifeboat Bradford ( Royal National Lifeboat Institution). She was on a voyage from Charleston, South Carolina, United States to London.
Try Again	United Kingdom	The barque was driven ashore at Great Yarmouth, Norfolk. Her ten crew were rescued by the Coastguard using rocket apparatus. She was on a voyage from South Shields, County Durham to Alicante, Spain.
Venus	United Kingdom	The schooner was driven ashore and wrecked at Lowestoft. Her four crew were rescued by rocket apparatus. She was on a voyage from Newcastle upon Tyne, Northumberland to London.
W. S. Flower	United Kingdom	The ship was driven ashore at "Appleby", Isle of Wight. Her crew were rescued. She was on a voyage from Goole, Yorkshire to London.
Unnamed	Flag unknown	The ship foundered off Great Yarmouth with the loss of all hands.
Unnamed	Flag unknown	The schooner was wrecked on the Brake Sand.
Unnamed	Flag unknown	The barque was wrecked on the Longnose Rock, on the Kent coast with the loss of all hands.

== 13 February ==
List of shipwrecks: 13 February 1869
Ship	State	Description
Alert, or Flirt	(United Kingdom of Great Britain and Ireland) Jersey	The schooner collided with the barque Europe (United Kingdom) and sank off the North Foreland, Kent. Her crew were rescued by Europe.
Alliance	United Kingdom	The ship was driven ashore near Rothesay, Isle of Bute. She was on a voyage from Glasgow, Renfrewshire to Suriname. She was refloated on 15 February and put back to Greenock, Renfrewshire.
Alvidia	Denmark	The ship was wrecked on the Longsand, in the North Sea off the coast of Essex, United Kingdom. Her crew were rescued by the smack Alfred (United Kingdom), which lost her captain effecting the rescue.
Anne	United Kingdom	The smack foundered off the Kent coast. Her crew survived.
Ann Mitchell, and Mystic Tye	United Kingdom; Canada	Ann Mitchell collided with Mystic Tye off Dungeness, Kent with the loss of two of her crew. She was on a voyage from South Shields, County Durham to Palermo, Sicily, Italy. Mystic Tye lost six of her crew. Both vessels were total losses.
Betsey	United Kingdom	The Mersey Flat ran aground on the West Hoyle Bank, in Liverpool Bay and sank. Her three crew were rescued by the Point of Ayr Lifeboat. She was on a voyage from Liverpool, Lancashire to Dublin.
Canadian	United Kingdom	The ship was driven ashore in the River Tay. She was refloated the next day and taken in to Dundee, Forfarshire.
Confidence	United Kingdom	The schooner sank on the Goodwin Sands, Kent. Her crew were rescued. She was on a voyage from Newcastle upon Tyne, Northumberland to Cork. Confidence floated off and came ashore at Cap Gris Nez, Pas-de-Calais, France. She was towed in to Calais in a leaky condition by a French fishing lugger.
Effort	United Kingdom	The brig was abandoned off the Kent coast with the loss of two of her crew. She was on a voyage from Newcastle upon Tyne to Lisbon, Portugal. She was later towed in to Margate.
Eleanor	United Kingdom	The ship was wrecked on the Crusader Bank, in the Irish Sea 8 nautical miles (15 km) off the coast of Lancashire. Her crew were rescued. She was on a voyage from Barrow-in-Furness to Liverpool.
Enoch Arden	United Kingdom	The barque was destroyed by fire in the South China Sea. Her crew were rescued. She was on a voyage from Cardiff, Glamorgan to Shanghai, China.
Eva	United Kingdom	The brig collided with another vessel and sank off the Kent coast with the loss of four of her seven crew.
Friends	United Kingdom	The schooner was driven ashore at Margate, Kent. Her crew were rescued by the Margate Lifeboat Quiver ( Royal National Lifeboat Institution).
Golden Grove	United Kingdom	The brig struck the pier at Dover, Kent and was scuttled. She was on a voyage from South Shields to Cartagena, Spain.
H. Day	United Kingdom	The schooner sank off Deal, Kent. Her crew were rescued.
Hermann	United States	The paddle steamer was wrecked at Point Kwatzu, Japan with the loss of 275 lives.
Hope	United Kingdom	The ship ran aground on the Goodwin Sands and was abandoned with the loss of two of her crew. She was on a voyage from Newcastle upon Tyne to Lisbon. She was towed in to Ramsgate in a derelict condition.
Island Chief	United Kingdom	The barque ran aground and was wrecked on the Goodwin Sand. Five of the sixteen people on board took to a boat; they were reported missing. Survivors were rescued by the Ramsgate Lifeboat Bradford ( Royal National Lifeboat Institution). Island Chief was on a voyage from South Shields to Cartagena, Spain.
Janet Smith	United Kingdom	The sloop was wrecked at Berwick upon Tweed, Northumberland. Her crew were rescued. She was on a voyage from Burntisland, Fife to Berwick upon Tweed.
Julia	(United Kingdom of Great Britain and Ireland) Guernsey	The ship collided with Victoria (United Kingdom) off Dungeness, Kent with the loss of six of her nine crew. Survivors were rescued by Victoria.
Kinburg	United Kingdom	The ship was abandoned by her crew. She was subsequently taken in to Dover, Kent.
Orlando	Hamburg	The ship was driven ashore on Heligoland with the loss of her captain. She was on a voyage from Hamburg to an English port.
Providence	United Kingdom	The brig was wrecked on Corton Sands, in the North Sea off the coast of Suffolk with the loss five of her crew. She was on a voyage from Newcastle upon Tyne to Cartagena. She was taken to South Shields, County Durham and was broken up there in 1870.
Quiver	( Royal National Lifeboat Institution)	The lifeboat was severely damaged whilst going to the assistance of Friends (United Kingdom).
Ruby	United Kingdom	The lugger was driven ashore and wrecked at Margate.
Snowdrop	United Kingdom	The schooner foundered in the Firth of Forth off Inchkeith with the loss of all seven crew. She was on a voyage from Pillau, Prussia to Leith, Lothian.
Stuart, and Thomas and William	United Kingdom	The collier Stuart collided with the sloop Thomas and William (United Kingdom) and a French vessel and sank off the North Foreland with the loss of three of her six crew. Survivors were rescued by Thomas and William, which made for Ramsgate but sank off the North Foreland.
Thane of Fife	United Kingdom	The steamship ran aground at Tayport, Fife. She was on a voyage from Tayport to Broughty Ferry, Forfarshire. She was refloated and resumed her voyage.
Wave	United Kingdom	The ship ran aground on the Brake Sand. She was refloated.
William Skinner	United Kingdom	The brig collided with a Trieste barque and sank off Sandown, Kent. Her crew were rescued. She was on a voyage from Sunderland, County Durham to Littlehampton, Sussex.

== 14 February ==
List of shipwrecks: 14 February 1869
Ship	State	Description
Daisy	(United Kingdom of Great Britain and Ireland) Isle of Man	The sloop was driven ashore and wrecked near Whitehaven, Cumberland. Her crew were rescued.
Dove	United Kingdom	The smack collided with Ceres (United Kingdom) and sank off the Kent coast. Her crew were rescued.
Fly	United Kingdom	The ship was wrecked on the Crosby Spit, in Liverpool Bay. Her six crew survived. She was on a voyage from Belfast, County Antrim to Garston, Lancashire.
Friends	United Kingdom	The ketch ran aground on the Whiting Sand. She was on a voyage from Hull, Yorkshire to Woodbridge, Suffolk. She was refloated and taken in to Lowestoft, Suffolk in a leaky condition.
Jeune Marie Louise	(flag) France	The ship was driven ashore near "Tour". She was on a voyage from Cardiff, Glamorgan to "Basse Indre". She was refloated the next day and taken in to Le Croisic, Loire-Inférieure.
Lilian	United Kingdom	The ship collided with the brig Ersillia (Italy) and sank off Penarth, Glamorgan.
Pearl	United Kingdom	The brig struck a sunken wreck off Bexhill-on-Sea, Sussex. She was consequently beached 2 nautical miles (3.7 km) east of Rye, Sussex and was wrecked. Her crew were rescued by the Rye Lifeboat.
Prosperous	United Kingdom	The ship was driven ashore east of Dunkirk, Nord, France. Her crew were rescued by a tug. She was on a voyage from Middlesbrough, Yorkshire to Dunkirk.
Richard	United Kingdom	The ship struck a sunken wreck and foundered in the Bristol Channel off Lundy Island, Devon. Her crew were rescued by Express (United Kingdom). Richard was on a voyage from Briton Ferry, Glamorgan to Teignmouth, Devon.
St. Vincent	United Kingdom	The 834-ton ship went ashore in a heavy gale in Palliser Bay, Cook Strait, while en route from Wellington Harbour to Lyttelton Harbour. Twenty of the 22 men on board perished.
Thane of Fife	United Kingdom	The steamship ran aground at Broughty Ferry, Forfarshire. Her passengers were taken off. She was on a voyage from Tayport, Fife to Broughty Ferry. She was later refloated.
Union	United Kingdom	The ship struck a sunken wreck and foundered in the North Sea 10 nautical miles (19 km) off Orfordness, Suffolk. Her crew were rescued by the steamship Nora (United Kingdom). Union was on a voyage from Amble, Northumberland to Boulogne, Pas-de-Calais, France.

== 15 February ==
List of shipwrecks: 15 February 1869
Ship	State	Description
Alma Elizabeth	(flag) Bremen	The ship ran aground on the Krantz Sand, in the North Sea. She was on a voyage from Gibara, Cuba to Bremen.
Arab	United Kingdom	The brig was abandoned in the Irish Sea. Her crew were rescued. She was on a voyage from Maryport, Cumberland to Dublin. Arab was taken in to Ramsey, Isle of Man in a derelict condition.
Harpswell	United States	The ship was abandoned in the Atlantic Ocean. Her crew were rescued. She was on a voyage from Havre de Grâce, Seine-Inférieure, France to New York.
Lizzy	United Kingdom	The schooner ran aground at the mouth of the River Tees. She was on a voyage from Middlesbrough, North Riding of Yorkshire to Neath, Glamorgan. She was refloated and resumed her voyage, but put in to Grimsby, Lincolnshire.
Sankey	United Kingdom	The ship was driven ashore and wrecked at Le Touquet, Pas-de-Calais, France. She wasn on a voyage from Sunderland, County Durham to Saint-Valery-sur-Somme, Somme, France.
Wilhelmina	Flag unknown	The schooner was driven ashore at Youghal, County Cork.

== 16 February ==
List of shipwrecks: 16 February 1869
Ship	State	Description
Camel	United Kingdom	The schooner was driven ashore near Portaferry, County Down. She was on a voyage from Castle Espie, County Down to Maryport, Cumberland.
Eliza Caroline	United Kingdom	The barque ran aground on Scroby Sands, Norfolk. She was on a voyage from London to Cartagena, Spain. She was refloated the next day with the assistance of four tugs and beached at Great Yarmouth, Norfolk. She was refloated on 18 February and towed in to Harwich, Essex in a severely leaky condition.
Caroline	United Kingdom	The ship ran aground at Farsund, Norway. She was on a voyage from Cimbritshamn, Sweden to London.
Lionne	France	The sloop ran aground on the Nore. She was on a voyage from Gravelines, Nord to London.
Marian	United Kingdom	The ship was damaged by fire in the River Mersey. She was on a voyage from Liverpool, Lancashire to Rio de Janeiro, Brazil. Another fire was discovered and extinguished the next day. Arson was suspected to be the cause.
Napoleon	France	The sloop ran aground on the Nore. She was on a voyage from Gravelines to London.
Princa Adalbert	Prussia	The schooner was driven ashore at Waterford, United Kingdom. She was on a voyage from Falmouth, Cornwall to Waterford.
Queirol	United Kingdom	The barque was driven ashore at Waterford. She was on a voyage from Odesa, Russia to Queenstown, County Cork. She was refloated and taken in to Ballyhack, County Wexford in a leaky condition.
Temperanza	Italy	The barque was abandoned in the Atlantic Ocean. Her crew were rescued by the schooner Flora (United Kingdom). Temperanza was on a voyage from the River Tyne to Genoa.

== 17 February ==
List of shipwrecks: 17 February 1869
Ship	State	Description
Clara R.	United Kingdom	The brig was driven ashore at Greenisland, County Antrim. She was on a voyage from Garston, Lancashire to Dublin. She was refloated on 19 February and towed in to Warrenpoint, County Antrim.
Favourite	United Kingdom	The fishing sloop collided with Jonge Ipe (Netherlands) and sank in the North Sea. Her crew were rescued by Jonge Ipe.
Jane and Margaret	(United Kingdom of Great Britain and Ireland) Isle of Man	The smack sank in Ramsey Bay. Her three crew survived.
Laurel	(United Kingdom of Great Britain and Ireland) Isle of Man	The smack capsized and sank in Ramsey Bay with the loss of all three crew.
Ringende Jacob	Flag unknown	The barque ran aground on the Blacktail Sand, in the Thames Estuary. She was on a voyage from Belize City, British Honduras to London.
Robert Pulsford	United Kingdom	The full-rigged ship was driven ashore at the Hook Lighthouse, County Wexford. She was on a voyage from Manila, Spanish East Indies to Cork. She was refloated and sailed for Liverpool, Lancashire.

== 18 February ==
List of shipwrecks: 18 February 1869
Ship	State	Description
Prince Pierre-Bonaparte	France	The packet ship was run into by Latouche-Tréville (French Navy) and sank off the Hyères Islands with the loss of sixteen lives. There were about 30 survivors, who were rescued by Latouche-Tréville. Prince Pierre-Bonaparte was on a voyage from Corsica to Marseille, Bouches-du-Rhône.
Unnamed	Flag unknown	The ship was driven ashore and wrecked in the Shetland Islands.

== 19 February ==
List of shipwrecks: 19 February 1869
Ship	State	Description
Inca	United Kingdom	The ship was wrecked near Belmullet, County Wexford.
Julie Auguste	Malta	The ship ran aground on the Galloper Sand, in the North Sea. She was on a voyage from South Shields, County Durham, United Kingdom to Alexandria, Egypt. She was refloated and taken in to Grimsby, Lincolnshire, United Kingdom in a leaky condition.

== 20 February ==
List of shipwrecks: 20 February 1869
Ship	State	Description
Arun	United Kingdom	The brig struck a sunken wreck off Deal, Kent and was damaged.
Deucy	United States	The ship was abandoned in the Atlantic Ocean. She was on a voyage from Bucksport, Maine to Cárdenas, Cuba.
SMS Graf Radetzky	Austro-Hungarian Navy	The screw frigate sank in the Adriatic Sea 10 nautical miles (18.5 km) north-northwest of Lissa after suffering a gunpowder explosion. The explosion and sinking killed 344 men, leaving 24 survivors.
James	United Kingdom	The ship departed from Blyth, Northumberland for Fredrikshavn, Denmark. No further trace, presumed foundered with the loss of all hands.
Vesta	United Kingdom	The steamship ran aground on the Nore. She was on a voyage from Rotterdam, South Holland, Netherlands to London. She was refloated and taken in to Gravesend, Kent.

== 21 February ==
List of shipwrecks: 21 February 1869
Ship	State	Description
Eugenie	Stralsund	The brig departed from Holyhead, Anglesey, United Kingdom for Cárdenas, Cuba. No further trace, presumed foundered with the loss of all hands.
Hinrich	Prussia	The yacht sank off Læsø, Denmark. She was on a voyage from Kiel to Leith, Lothian, United Kingdom.
Jasper	United Kingdom	The ship ran aground on the Isle of Arran. She was on a voyage from Liverpool, Lancashire to Glasgow, Renfrewshire. She was refloated on 23 February.
Sally	United Kingdom	The ship ran aground and sank in the River Nene at Wisbech, Cambridgeshire. She was on a voyage from South Shields, County Durham to Wisbech.

== 22 February ==
List of shipwrecks: 22 February 1869
Ship	State	Description
Hannah Petterson	Norway	The ship was driven ashore and wrecked at Great Yarmouth, Norfolk, United Kingdom. Her twenty crew were rescued by the Caister Lifeboat. She was on a voyage from South Shields, County Durham, United Kingdom to Odesa, Russia.
Marie Leboef	France	The schooner capsized off the Goodwin Sands, Kent, United Kingdom with the loss of a crew member. She was on a voyage from Antwerp, Belgium to the Charente.

== 23 February ==
List of shipwrecks: 23 February 1869
Ship	State	Description
Buccleuch	United Kingdom	The steamship suffered a boiler explosion at Great Yarmouth, Norfolk. She was on a voyage from Great Yarmouth to Hull, Yorkshire.

== 24 February ==
List of shipwrecks: 24 February 1869
Ship	State	Description
Amalia	United Kingdom	The schooner ran aground at Eyemouth, Berwickshire and was damaged. She was on a voyage from Mandal, Norway to Eyemouth.
Candace	United Kingdom	The ship was abandoned in the Atlantic Ocean. Her crew were rescued. She was on a voyage from Faial Island, Azores to Boston, Massachusetts, United States.
Hispania	United Kingdom	The steamship collided with the barque Constance (United Kingdom) and sank. Her crew were rescued. She was on a voyage from Cardiff, Glamorgan to Gibraltar.
Ingria	Netherlands	The ship was wrecked on the Goodwin Sands, Kent, United Kingdom. Her crew were rescued. She was on a voyage from Dordrecht, South Holland to Savannah, Georgia, United States.
Primrose	United Kingdom	The ship was abandoned in Morecambe Bay. She was on a voyage from Ardrossan, Ayrshire to Barrow-in-Furness, Lancashire.
Prince	United Kingdom	The schooner ran aground on the Ouze Edge Sand, in the Thames Estuary. She was refloated.

== 25 February ==
List of shipwrecks: 25 February 1869
Ship	State	Description
James	United Kingdom	The brig departed from Blyth, Northumberland for a Baltic port. No further trace, presumed foundered with the loss of all seven crew.
John Bunyan	United Kingdom	The brig departed from Blyth for a Baltic port. No further trace, presumed foundered with the loss of all hands.
Ross	United Kingdom	The ship was abandoned in the English Channel 25 nautical miles (46 km) off St. Catherine's Point, Isle of Wight. Her crew were rescued by Antoinette (Bremen). Ross was on a voyage from Guernsey, Channel Islands to London.

== 26 February ==
List of shipwrecks: 26 February 1869
Ship	State	Description
Dantzig	United Kingdom	The brig was wrecked on the Medun Sand, in the Elbe. Her seven crew were rescued by the Cuxhaven Lifeboat. She was on a voyage from Newcastle upon Tyne, Northumberland to Hamburg.
Edith	United Kingdom	The steamship departed from South Shields, County Durham for Bergen, Norway. No further trace, presumed foundered with the loss of all fifteen crew.
Denmark	Flag unknown	The ship was abandoned in the Atlantic Ocean off Bermuda before 10 March. Her crew survived. She was on a voyage from Rio de Janeiro, Brazil to Saint John's.
Harry Bluff	United States	The clipper was wrecked on the South Shoal, off Nantucket, Massachusetts with the loss of four lives. She was on a voyage from Cádiz, Spain to Boston, Massachusetts.
Johannes	Prussia	The ship was abandoned in the Grand Banks of Newfoundland. Her crew were rescued by Pedro Plandolit (Flag unknown). Johannes was on a voyage from Savannah, Georgia, United States to Emden.

== 27 February ==
List of shipwrecks: 27 February 1869
Ship	State	Description
Canadian	United Kingdom	The ship was wrecked at Brimsness, Scotland. Her 22 crew were rescued.
Caroline	United Kingdom	The ship was driven ashore and wrecked at Burnham-on-Sea, Somerset. Her crew were rescued. She was on a voyage from Youghal, County Cork to Cardiff, Glamorgan.
Clifton Hall	United Kingdom	The ship foundered off Hoy Head, Orkney Islands with the loss of one life.
Ida Ziegler	Bremen	The clipper went ashore in a heavy gale at Petane Beach, Napier, New Zealand. All hands were saved.
J. A. Pierce	United Kingdom	The ship ran aground at Ardrossan, Ayrshire. She was refloated on 1 March and placed under repair.
Neland	Norway	The brig was driven against the quayside and damaged at Stavanger, She was on a voyage from Arendal to a Scottis port.
Shaftesbury	United Kingdom	The ship was wrecked on Baker Island.

== 28 February ==
List of shipwrecks: 28 February 1869
Ship	State	Description
Christine	Denmark	The ship capsized and sank with the loss of three of her crew. She was on a voyage from Newcastle upon Tyne, Northumberland, United Kingdom to Haderslev.
Immanuel	Norway	The ship was driven ashore and wrecked on Texel, North Holland, Netherlands. She was on a voyage from Fredrikshald to Liverpool, Lancashire, United Kingdom.
Little Fred	New Zealand	The 131-ton schooner ran aground and was wrecked to the north of the mouth of the Kaipara Harbour in a heavy gale.
Woodpecker	New Zealand	The 24-ton paddle steamer was wrecked in a heavy gale at the mouth of the Patea River, New Zealand. Her crew were rescued by the paddle steamer Sturt (New Zealand).

== Unknown date ==
List of shipwrecks: Unknown date in February 1869
Ship	State	Description
Andrew Jackson	United States	The ship ran aground in the Hooghly River. She was on a voyage from Calcutta, India to Boston, Massachusetts. She was refloated and resumed her voyage.
Ann	United Kingdom	The fishing smack was abandoned in the North Sea. She was towed in to Lowestoft, Suffolk on 16 February.
Bellcarigg	United Kingdom	The ship was destroyed by fire in Indian Ocean. She was on a voyage from Sunderland, County Durham to Bombay, India.
Brilliant	United Kingdom	The ship was abandoned in the Atlantic Ocean before 11 February. Her crew were rescued by Europe (United Kingdom). Brilliant was on a voyage from Wilmington, Delaware, United States to Liverpool, Lancashire.
HMS Cracker	Royal Navy	The ship ran aground at least once off the south east coast of the United States during February.
Gently	United Kingdom	The steamboat sank at Newcastle upon Tyne, Northumberland. She was refloated on 11 February.
Jason	United Kingdom	The ship ran aground in St. Francis Bay. She was on a voyage from Calcutta, Indian to the West Indies. She was refloated and towed in to Table Bay.
Jean	United Kingdom	The schooner caught fire in the Firth of Forth and was abandoned by her crew, who were rescued by a fishing boat. She was on a voyage from Sunderland to Fraserburgh, Aberdeenshire. She came ashore at Stonehaven, Aberdeenshire and was wrecked.
J. P. Whitney	United States	The ship foundered in the Indian Ocean after 17 February. She was on a voyage from Calcutta to Mauritius.
Jupiter	Austria-Hungary	The steamship ran aground at "Daila" before 13 February.
Maria Theresa	United Kingdom	The ship ran aground in Moor Sound. She was on a voyage from Riga, Russia to Grimsby, Lincolnshire.
Meggy	United Kingdom	The barque was driven ashore and wrecked north of Jaraguá do Sul, Brazil.
Michigan	Canada	The ship was abandoned in the Atlantic Ocean before 17 February.
Nordcap	Bremen	The barque was wrecked at Galveston, Texas, United States. She was on a voyage from Bremen to Galveston.
Parat	United Kingdom	The ship foundered with the loss of her captain. She was on a voyage from Alexandria, Egypt to Falmouth, Cornwall.
Syrian	United Kingdom	The steamship was driven ashore and wrecked in Corcubian Bay, near Cape Finisterre, Spain. Her crew were rescued. She was on a voyage from Alexandria to Liverpool.
Telegraph	United Kingdom	The ship sprang a leak and was beached at Bocas del Toro, United States of Colombia. She was on a voyage from Colón, United States of Colombia to "San Ancreas".
William and John	United Kingdom	The ship was abandoned in the North Sea between 11 and 15 February. Her crew were rescued by America (United Kingdom).
Willing Lass	United Kingdom	The ship foundered off the Isle of Arran on or before 6 February.
Woolward	United Kingdom	The barque foundered in the Atlantic Ocean before 14 February. Her fourteen crew were rescued by Francis Hilyard (United States).
