= Celandine =

Celandine ( /ˈsɛləndaɪn/ or /-iːn/) is a common name for three species of flowers:

- Chelidonium majus, greater celandine, in the poppy family
- Ficaria verna, Lesser celandine (formerly Ranunculus ficaria), in the buttercup family
- Stylophorum diphyllum, celandine-poppy, in the poppy family

Celandine may also refer to:

- Celandine (novel), a novel by Steve Augarde
- HMS Celandine
- Ukrain, a chemical compound also known as celandine
