= HMS Advantage (W 133) =

Favourite-class tugboat of the Royal Navy

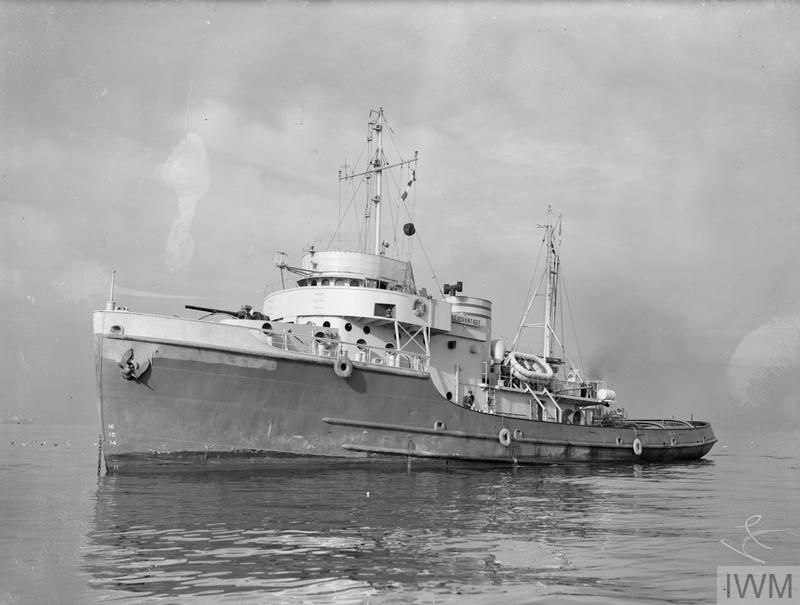
- HMS Advantage in Greenock, 21 September 1944

History

United Kingdom
- Name: Advantage
- Builder: Levingston Shipbuilding Company, Orange, Texas
- Launched: 7 September 1942
- Commissioned: 23 April 1943
- Fate: Transferred to merchant service

General characteristics
- Displacement: 852 tons light
- Length: 165 ft 6 in (50.44 m)
- Beam: 33 ft 4 in (10.16 m)
- Draught: 15 ft 6 in (4.72 m)
- Installed power: 2 x Babcock & Wilson "D"-type boilers; 2 x Turbo drive Ships Service Generators
- Propulsion: 1 x Fulton Iron Works vertical triple-expansion reciprocating steam engine; 1 x propeller
- Speed: 12.2 knots (22.6 km/h; 14.0 mph)
- Complement: 52
- Armament: 1 × 3"/50 caliber gun; 2 × single 20mm AA guns

HMS Advantage (W 133) was a Favourite-class tugboat of the Royal Navy during the Second World War. Built in the United States, she was transferred to the Royal Navy under Lend-Lease. Advantage served until the end of the war with the Royal Navy and was returned to the United States postwar. Sold to a Chinese merchant shipping company, she served successively as 109, Ming 309, and Kaoshiung until her 1965 scrapping.

== Design ==
Advantage was 165 ft 6 in (50.44 m) long overall, with a beam of 33 feet 4 inches (10.16 m) wide and a draught of 15 feet 6 inches (4.72 m). She displaced 852 long tons (866 t) as designed and up to 1,315 long tons (1,336 t) at full load. Advantage was powered by a one-shaft Fulton Iron Works vertical triple-expansion reciprocating steam engine rated at 1,600 shaft horsepower (1,200 kW), two Babcock and Wilcox "D" type boilers, generating a top speed of 12.2 kn (22.6 km/h; 14.0 mph), and two Turbo drive Ship's Service Generators. Advantage was armed with one 3 in (76mm)/50 caliber dual purpose gun and two single 20mm (.787 in) anti-aircraft guns. She carried a crew of five officers and 47 enlisted men.

== Service history ==
=== Construction ===
Advantage's keel was laid down on 8 August 1942. She was launched on 7 September 1942 as USS Advantage (ATR-41) by the Levingston Shipbuilding Company at Orange, Texas. Advantage was redesignated BATR-41 under the Lend-Lease program, and she was transferred and commissioned into the Royal Navy on 23 April 1943.

=== Royal Navy career ===
She served throughout World War II with the Royal Navy. After commissioning, she sailed to New Orleans for ranging, deperming, final stores, and spare parts. On 19 May 1943, Advantage arrived at New Orleans. She departed the next day. On 24 May, the tug was assigned to Bermuda. On 12 March 1945, she left Aden towing Admiralty Floating Dock (AFD) 53 alongside HMS Bold (W114), arriving at Colombo on 28 March. Alongside HMS Cheerly (W 153), Advantage towed AFD 18 from Cochin to Darwin as part of Convoy WO 4A, departing on 9 April and arriving at Darwin on 24 May. Advantage and Cheerly towed two floating docks from Glasgow to Darwin, a distance of 14,000 miles, arriving at their destination on 1 August. Admiral Bruce Fraser, the British Pacific Fleet commander, personally thanked both crews in Darwin. During the voyage Lieutenant T. Phillips commanded the tug.

=== Postwar ===
Advantage was returned to the US Navy on 19 February 1946. Advantage reverted to BATR-41 after her name was withdrawn. She was struck on 12 April 1946 and sold to the Chinese Board of Supplies. The tug was sold to the China Merchants Steam Navigation Company in Shanghai on 24 September 1946. Renamed 109 on 31 July 1948, she was again renamed Ming 309 later. She was finally renamed Kaoshiung in 1949 and scrapped in 1965.
