= Cruizer class =

Cruizer class may refer to:

- Cruizer-class sloop (1752), a mid 18th century brig-sloop class of the Royal Navy
- Cruizer-class brig-sloop, a Napoleonic War brig-sloop class of the Royal Navy.
- Cruizer-class sloop, an 1850s sloop class of the Royal Navy.

== See also ==
- HMS Cruizer
- Cruiser
