= List of shipwrecks in January 1869 =

The list of shipwrecks in January 1869 includes ships sunk, foundered, grounded, or otherwise lost during January 1869.

== 1 January ==
List of shipwrecks: 1 January 1869
Ship	State	Description
Bee	United Kingdom	The brig was driven ashore 3 nautical miles (5.6 km) west of the Point of Ayr, Isle of Man. Her crew were rescued. She was on a voyage from Harrington, Cumberland to Cardiff, Glamorgan.
Bride	United Kingdom	The barque was wrecked 6 nautical miles (11 km) east of Cutler, Maine, United States. Her crew were rescued. She was on a voyage from Saint John, New Brunswick, Canada to Londonderry.
Clarissa	United Kingdom	The ship ran aground on the Longsand, in the North Sea off the cost of Essex. She was on a voyage from Sunderland, County Durham to Trouville-sur-Mer, Calvados, France. She was refloated and beached at Harwich, Essex.
Concord	United Kingdom	The ship ran aground in the River Bladnoch and was damaged. She was on a voyage from Maryport, Cumberland to Wigtown.
Effort	United Kingdom	The schooner was wrecked off Jethou, Channel Islands.
Everton	United Kingdom	The collier, a brig, was run into by Sir Robert Peel (United Kingdom) and sank in the River Thames at Canvey Island, Essex. All 31 people on board were rescued. She was on a voyage from Hartlepool, County Durham to London.
Fairy	United Kingdom	The schooner was wrecked at Hastings, Sussex. She was on a voyage from Hastings to Hartlepool.
Glenorchy	United Kingdom	The full-rigged ship ran aground on the Kish Bank, in the Irish Sea off the coast of County Dublin and sank. Her 29 crew were rescued. She was on her maiden voyage from Glasgow, Renfrewshire to Bombay, India.
Gowerian	United Kingdom	The ship ran aground and sank. Her crew were rescued. She was on a voyage from Liverpool, Lancashire to Kingstown, County Dublin.
Hilda	United Kingdom	The ship ran aground on the West Mouse, in Liverpool Bay. She was on a voyage from Runcorn, Cheshire to Torquay, Devon. She was refloated and taken in to Beaumaris, Anglesey in a leaky condition.
Pelican	United Kingdom	The ship was driven ashore and severely damaged at Hastings. She was on a voyage from Hastings to Hartlepool.
Philomele Siemen	Prussia	The ship was wrecked on the Can Rocks. Her crew were rescued. She was on a voyage from a port in Schleswig to Leith, Lothian, United Kingdom.
Smiler	United Kingdom	The ship was driven ashore 3 nautical miles (5.6 km) west of the Point of Ayr. She was on a voyage from Whitehaven, Cumberland to Cardiff, Glamorgan. She was refloated and towed in to Ramsey, Isle of Man in a leaky condition.

== 2 January ==
List of shipwrecks: 2 January 1869
Ship	State	Description
Admiral Napier	United Kingdom	The ship struck the pier at Ullapool, Ross-shire and was beached. She was on a voyage from Loch Broom to Ullapool.
Aurora	United Kingdom	The ship sank off Thorne Island, Pembrokeshire. She was on a voyage from Barrow-in-Furness, Lancashire to Neath, Glamorgan.
Belle	United Kingdom	The collier, a brig, ran aground on the Sizewell Bank, in the North Sea off the coast of Suffolk and sank with the loss of her captain. Nine survivors were rescued by the Aldeburgh Lifeboat Ipswich ( Royal National Lifeboat Institution). She was on a voyage from Sunderland, County Durham to Ostend, West Flanders, Belgium.
Cautious	United Kingdom	The schooner ran aground on the Stoney Binks, off the mouth of the Humber and was abandoned by her crew. She was on a voyage from Sunderland, County Durham to Nantes, Loire-Inférieure, France. She floated off, and was taken in to Grimsby, Lincolnshire in a leaky condition by the Spurn Lifeboat.
Cordelia	United Kingdom	The ship was driven ashore at Margate, Kent. She was on a voyage from South Shields, County Durham to Exmouth, Devon. She was refloated.
Dolphin	United Kingdom	The steamship ran aground on the wreck of Palma United Kingdom in the River Thames at Lower Hope, Kent and was damaged. Her passengers were taken off by Vestal ( Trinity House). Dolphin was on a voyage from Antwerp, Belgium to London.
Ellen	United Kingdom	The sloop ran aground on the Foreness Rock, Margate. She was on a voyage from Great Yarmouth, Norfolk to Penzance, Cornwall. She was refloated and taken in to Margate.
Emaus	United Kingdom	The ship was driven ashore at Margate. She was on a voyage from Sunderland to Caen, Calvados. She was refloated.
Jeannie	United Kingdom	The schooner struck the pier and was wrecked at Aberdeen with the loss of all three of her four crew. The survivor was rescued by rocket apparatus. She was on a voyage from Stonehaven, Aberdeenshire to Aberdeen.
Manney	United Kingdom	The brig was driven onto the Foreness Rock, Margate. She was on a voyage from Sunderland to Southampton, Hampshire. She was refloated with assistance.
Ocean Home	United Kingdom	The full-rigged ship caught fire at Spithead and was beached at the Haslar Hospital, Portsmouth, Hampshire, where she burnt out. Her crew were rescued. She was on a voyage from Antwerp, Belgium to Liverpool, Lancashire.
Palma	United Kingdom	The brig collided with the steamship Hebe (United Kingdom and sank in the River Thames at Lower Hope.
Phoenix	United Kingdom	The ship sank off the Copeland Islands, County Down. She was on a voyage from Maryport, Cumberland to Portaferry, County Down.
Sophia	United Kingdom	The ship struck the Brandies, off the Saltee Islands, County Wexford and sank. Her four crew survived. She was on a voyage from Troon, Ayrshire to Waterford.

== 3 January ==
List of shipwrecks: 3 January 1869
Ship	State	Description
Barclay	United Kingdom	The schooner was abandoned off Aberdeen. Her crew were rescued by the Aberdeen Lifeboat. She was on a voyage from Sunderland, County Durham to Arbroath, Forfarshire.
Beatrice	United Kingdom	The ship departed from Baltimore, Maryland, United States for Liverpool, Lancashire. Although sighted off Cape Henry, Virginia on 13 January, she was presumed to have subsequently foundered with the loss of all hands.
Charles C. Colgate	United States	The ship was sighted in the Atlantic Ocean whilst on a voyage from Mobile, Alabama to Liverpool. No further trace, presumed foundered with the loss of all hands.
Elizabeth	United Kingdom	The brig ran aground on the Cross Sand, in the North Sea off the coast of Norfolk and was wrecked. Her crew were rescued by the Caister Lifeboat. She was on a voyage from Blyth, Northumberland to Boulogne, Pas-de-Calais, France.
Fermosca	Italy	The barque was abandoned off Great Yarmouth, Norfolk, United Kingdom. Her crew were rescued by the Great Yarmouth Lifeboat. She was on a voyage from Grimsby, Lincolnshire, United Kingdom to Alexandria, Egypt. She was subsequently taken in to Lowestoft, Suffolk, United Kingdom in a leaky condition.
Gaspard	France	The schooner was wrecked on the Goodwin Sands, Kent, United Kingdom. Her five crew took to a boat; her captain was rescued by the Ramsgate Lifeboat. She was on a voyage from Saint-Malo, Ille-et-Vilaine to London.
Isabella	United Kingdom	The schooner sank off the coast of County Wexford with the loss of two of her seven crew. Survivors were rescued by Malakoff (United Kingdom). Isabella was on a voyage from Newport, Monmouthshire to Waterford.
Jane Anderson	New Zealand	The schooner was driven ashore in a gale at Dunedin.
Just in Time	New Zealand	The schooner sank in a gale at Dunedin.
Liberty	United Kingdom	The ship was driven ashore. She was on a voyage from Newcastle upon Tyne, Northumberland to Dieppe, Seine-Inférieure, France. She was refloated and taken in to Ramsgate, Kent in a leaky condition.
Pride	New Zealand	The schooner sank in a gale at Dunedin.
Renshaw	United Kingdom	The schooner sank in the North Sea 20 nautical miles (37 km) off Tod Head, Aberdeenshire. Her six crew were rescued by the schooner Taurus (United Kingdom). Renshaw was on a voyage from South Shields, County Durham to Montrose, Forfarshire.
Ruffine	United Kingdom	The ship ran aground on the Goodwin Sands. She was on a voyage from Sunderland, County Durham to Shanghai, China. She was refloated and taken in to Ostend, West Flanders, Belgium in a leaky condition.
R. Wark	United Kingdom	The ship was sighted in the South Atlantic whilst on a voyage from Madras, India for Marseille, Bouches-du-Rhône, France. No further trace, presumed foundered with the loss of all hands.
Sandringham	United Kingdom	The brig was destroyed by fire in The Downs. She was on a voyage from London to Bordeaux, Gironde, France.
Vindex	United Kingdom	The ship collided with the barque Orient (Russia) off the coast of Norfolk. Vindex was run ashore at Great Yarmouth, Norfolk and was wrecked. Her crew were rescued by the Gorleston Lifeboat. She was on a voyage from South Shields, County Durham to Portsmouth, Hampshire.
William	United Kingdom	The ship ran aground on the Brake Sand. She was on a voyage from Middlesbrough, Yorkshire to Exeter, Devon. She was refloated and put in to Ramsgate, Kent.
Unnamed	Flag unknown	The brig was wrecked on the Longsand, in the North Sea off the coast of Essex, United Kingdom.
Unnamed	Flag unknown	The schooner was wrecked at Aberdeen with the loss of three of her four crew.

== 4 January ==
List of shipwrecks: 4 January 1869
Ship	State	Description
Ann Henzell	United Kingdom	The brig was driven ashore on Texel, North Holland, Netherlands. She was on a voyage from Newcastle upon Tyne, Northumberland to the Nieuw Diep.
Busteriana	United Kingdom	The ship was driven ashore at "Palatuan, Camerines coast", Luzon, Spanish East Indies and was abandoned by her crew. She was on a voyage from Liverpool, Lancashire to Manila, Spanish East Indies.
Claudia	United Kingdom	The ship ran aground on Taylor's Bank, in Liverpool Bay. She was on a voyage from Garston, Lancashire to Dublin. She was refloated and put back to Garston in a leaky condition.
Jane	Austria-Hungary	The brig ran aground on the Inner Dowsing Sandbank. She was on a voyage from South Shields, County Durham, United Kingdom to a Mediterranean port. She was refloated and taken in to Dover, Kent, United Kingdom in a leaky condition.
Jane	Canada	The ship was abandoned in the Atlantic Ocean. Her crew were rescued by the steamship City of Baltimore (United Kingdom). Jane was on a voyage from Trinidad to Halifax, Nova Scotia.
Minnie	United Kingdom	The barque ran aground on Scroby Sands, Norfolk. She was on a voyage from Hull to the Cameroon River. She was refloated with assistance and taken in to Winterton-on-Sea, Norfolk.
Pascoe Grenfell	United Kingdom	The ship was sighted off Great Yarmouth, Norfolk whilst on a voyage from Sunderland, County Durham to Villaricos, Spain. No further trace, presumed foundered with the loss of all hands.
Water Kelpie	Rostock	The ship was driven ashore at Burg auf Fehmarn, Prussia. She was on a voyage from Newcastle upon Tyne to Kiel, Prussia. She had been refloated by 6 January and resumed her voyage.
William	United Kingdom	The schooner sprang a leak and was beached at Dover, Kent. She was on a voyage from Sunderland to Rye, Sussex.
William and Mary	United Kingdom	The fishing smack sank off Lowestoft, Suffolk. Her crew survived.

== 5 January ==
List of shipwrecks: 5 January 1869
Ship	State	Description
Ada	Canada	The barque ran aground on Smith's Knowl, in the North Sea off the coast of Norfolk, United Kingdom and was abandoned by her crew, eleven of whom were rescued by the barque Alpha (Prussia), The rest of her crew took to the longboat; they were reported missing. Ada was on a voyage from Middlesbrough, Yorkshire to New York. She was towed in to the Nieuw Diep in a derelict condition on 8 January by British Lion (United Kingdom).
Flying Cloud	United Kingdom	The tug struck the quayside at Helensburgh, Dunbartonshire and sank. She was on a voyage from Loch Long to Helensburgh. She was refloated on 16 January and taken in to Greenock, Renfrewshire for repairs.
Forth	United Kingdom	The schooner sprang a leak and was run ashore at Pittenweem, Fife, where she was wrecked. She was on a voyage from South Shields, County Durham to Aberdeen.
Freestone	Canada	The brigantine was abandoned in the Atlantic Ocean. Her crew were rescued by the barque Erycina (United Kingdom).
Gartlee	United Kingdom	The steam lighter capsized and sank in the Clyde near Dumbarton with the loss of one of her three crew. Survivors were rescued by the paddle steamer Dunoon Castle (United Kingdom).
Golovna	Norway	The ship was driven ashore on the "Island of Roth". She was on a voyage from London, United Kingdom to Kristiansand.
Ladovic Victor, or Ludovick William	United Kingdom	The schooner was driven ashore and wrecked at Thorntonloch, Lothian. Her five crew survived. She was on a voyage from Newcastle upon Tyne, Northumberland to Grangemouth, Stirlingshire.
Sir Charles Napier	United Kingdom	The tug sprang a leak and was beached in Loch Long. She was subsequently taken in to Greenock, Renfrewshire.
Start	United Kingdom	The fishing trawler sank off the south Devon coast. Her four crew were rescued by the Teignmouth Lifeboat China ( Royal National Lifeboat Institution).

== 6 January ==
List of shipwrecks: 6 January 1869
Ship	State	Description
Con Amore	Hamburg	The ship caught fire and exploded off Madeira. Her nineteen crew were rescued by RMS Athenian (United Kingdom).
Formby Lightship, and Glasgow	Trinity House; United Kingdom	The steamship Bradford ran into the Formby Lightship, which was severely damaged. Bradford was on a voyage from Liverpool, Lancashire to Sligo. She put back to Liverpool for repairs. The Formby Lightship was subsequently towed in to Liverpool.
Harvest Maid	United Kingdom	The schooner ran aground on the Longsand, in the North Sea off the coast of Essex. She was refloated and taken in to Ramsgate, Kent in a leaky condition.

== 7 January ==
List of shipwrecks: 7 January 1869
Ship	State	Description
Gesina Alida	Sweden	The ship was driven ashore at Kristiansand, Norway. She was on a voyage from Malmö to London, United Kingdom. She had sunk by 9 January.

== 8 January ==
List of shipwrecks: 8 January 1869
Ship	State	Description
Europa	United Kingdom	The brig ran aground on the Gunfleet Sand, in the North Sea off the coasst of Essex. She was on a voyage from Hartlepool, County Durham to London. She was refloated on 11 January and towed in to Harwich, Essex in a leaky condition.
Jutland	Denmark	The steamship ran aground off Thyborøn. She was on a voyage from London to Copenhagen. She was refloated on 11 January and taken in to the Thyborøn Canal.
Minnie	New Zealand	The ketch was driven onto rocks and holed at Little Akaloa, Banks Peninsula. All hands survived.

== 9 January ==
List of shipwrecks: 9 January 1869
Ship	State	Description
Horace	United Kingdom	The brig foundered in the North Sea off the coast of Norfolk with the loss of all hands.
Ravensbury	United Kingdom	The steamship ran aground on the Schulpenplaat, off Maassluis, South Holland, Netherlands. She was on a voyage from Harwich, Essex to Rotterdam, South Holland.

== 10 January ==
List of shipwrecks: 10 January 1869
Ship	State	Description
Nouveau Vigilant	France	The lugger foundered off Le Conquet, Finistère. Her crew were rescued.

== 11 January ==
List of shipwrecks: 11 January 1869
Ship	State	Description
Activ	Denmark	The ship was driven ashore and wrecked on the north coast of Skagen. Her crew were rescued. She was on a voyage from Leith, Lothian, United Kingdom to Eckernförde, Prussia.
Banana	Netherlands	The ship ran aground on the Goodwin sands, Kent, United Kingdom. She was refloated and assisted in to Ramsgate, Kent.
Gulf City	United States	The steamship foundered off Cape Lookout, North Carolina with the loss of 25 of the 28 people on board.
Johanna Elise	Belgium	The ship was wrecked at Savanilla, United States of Colombia. She was on a voyage from Antwerp to Savanilla.
Norway	United Kingdom	The ship ran aground on the Brake Sand. She was on a voyage from Bremerhaven to Cardiff, Glamorgan. She was refloated with assistance from the tug Aid (United Kingdom).
Twee Gebroders	Netherlands	The ship capsized at Vlissingen, Zeeland. She was righted on 16 January.
't Huis Gazzeweer	Netherlands	The ship was wrecked near Kristiansand, Norway. Her crew were rescued. She was on a voyage from Trondheim, Norway to London, United Kingdom.

== 12 January ==
List of shipwrecks: 12 January 1869
Ship	State	Description
Boaz	United Kingdom	The ship was wrecked at Cape Henry, Virginia, United States. she was on a voyage from Cardiff, Glamorgan to Baltimore, Maryland, United States.
Jackal	United Kingdom	The steamship was wrecked on the Bondicar Rocks, on the coast of Northumberland. Her crew were rescued She was on a voyage from Newcastle upon Tyne, Northumberland to Dundee, Forfarshire.
Venus	United Kingdom	The brigantine was abandoned off The Lizard, Cornwall. Her crew were rescued by Gwain Maid (United Kingdom)/ Venus was on a voyage from Swansea, Glamorgan to Rouen, Seine-Inférieure, France.

== 13 January ==
List of shipwrecks: 13 January 1869
Ship	State	Description
Arica	United Kingdom	The steamship was wrecked at Pacas Mayo, Peru.
Clyde	United States	The steamboat was wrecked in the Red River with the loss of six lives.
Falcon	United Kingdom	The ship ran aground on the Brest Rock, on the coast of Ayrshire. She was on a voyage from Caernarfon to Irvine, Ayrshire.
Flower of the Arun	United Kingdom	The ship ran aground at Teignmouth, Devon. She was on a voyage from Smyrna, Ottoman Empire to Teignmouth. She was refloated the next day and taken in to Teignmouth in a leaky condition.
Lily	United Kingdom	The sloop collided with HMRC Prince Albert ( Board of Customs) and sank in the English Channel off Plymouth, Devon. Her crew were rescued. She was on a voyage from London to Penryn, Cornwall.
Pilot	United Kingdom	The pilot boat collided with the pilot boat Petrel (United Kingdom) and sank in the Irish Sea 12 nautical miles (22 km) off Kinsale Head, County Cork. Both people on board were rescued.
Search	United Kingdom	The ship foundered in the North Sea. Her crew were rescued. She was on a voyage from Blyth, Northumberland to Tangier, Morocco.

== 14 January ==
List of shipwrecks: 14 January 1869
Ship	State	Description
Energy	United Kingdom	The ship was driven ashore at Mumby, Lincolnshire.
John Bunyan	United Kingdom	The ship departed from Cardiff, Glamorgan for Lisbon, Portugal. No further trace, presumed foundered with the loss of all hands.
Pilot	United Kingdom	The schooner collided with the schooner Petrel (United Kingdom) and sank at Queenstown, County Cork. Her crew were rescued.
Rollo	United Kingdom	The ship was run ashore in St. Aubin's Bay, Jersey, Channel Islands. She was on a voyage from Rotterdam, South Holland to Jersey. She was refloated and towed in to Saint Aubin, Jersey and beached.

== 15 January ==
List of shipwrecks: 15 January 1869
Ship	State	Description
Alexandrine	France	The schooner was wrecked on the Doom Bar. Her six crew were rescued by the Padstow Lifeboat Albert Edward ( Royal National Lifeboat Institution).
Arzoumels	United Kingdom	The chasse-marée was driven ashore at Hayle, Cornwall, United Kingdom. She was on a voyage from Swansea, Glamorgan, United Kingdom to the Charente. She was consequently condemned.
Christen Winkel	Denmark	The schooner was wrecked on the Goodwin Sands, Kent, United Kingdom. Her crew were rescued by tug Aid (United Kingdom) and the Ramsgate Lifeboat Bradford ( Royal National Lifeboat Institution). Christen Winkel was on a voyage from Hartlepool, County Durham, United Kingdom to Lisbon, Portugal.
Diletti Mimbelli	Flag unknown	The ship ran aground in the Dardanelles. She was on a voyage from Marianople, Russia to Falmouth, Cornwall, United Kingdom.
Georges Alfred	France	The ship ran aground on the North Rock, in the Belfast Lough. She was on a voyage from Nantes, Loire-Inférieure to Glasgow, Renfrewshire, United Kingdom. She was refloated on 22 January and towed in to Belfast, County Antrim, United Kingdom.
Havelock	United Kingdom	The schooner was run down and sunk in the North Sea off Orfordness, Suffolk by the steamship Edith (United Kingdom). Her seven crew were rescued by Edith. Havelock was on a voyage from the River Tyne to Whitstable, Kent.
Lady Octavia	United Kingdom	The ship collided with a schooner and was run ashore near Kingsdown, Kent. She was on a voyage from Calcutta, India to London. She was refloated and taken in tow for London.
Lord Coke	United Kingdom	The schooner was wrecked on the Sizewell Bank, in the North Sea off the coast of Suffolk. Her four crew were rescued by the Southwold Lifeboat. She was on a voyage from Newcastle upon Tyne, Northumberland to Woolwich, Kent
Thomas	United Kingdom	The brigantine was wrecked on the Doom Bar. Her six crew, and eight would-be rescuers, were rescued by the Padstow Lifeboat Albert Edward ( Royal National Lifeboat Institution). Thomas was on a voyage from Swansea to Poole, Dorset.
Walter	United States	The barque was driven ashore at Whitford Point, Glamorgan. She was on a voyage from Havre de Grâce, Seine-Inférieure, France to Cardiff, Glamorgan.
Unnamed	United Kingdom	The brigantine was wrecked on the Doom Bar. Her crew were rescued by the Padstow Lifeboat Albert Edward ( Royal National Lifeboat Institution).
Unnamed	France	The schooner was wrecked on the Doom Bar. Her crew were rescued by the Padstow Lifeboat Albert Edward ( Royal National Lifeboat Institution).

== 16 January ==
List of shipwrecks: 16 January 1869
Ship	State	Description
Atlas	United Kingdom	The ship was driven ashore at Winterton-on-Sea, Norfolk. She was refloated the next day and towed in to Great Yarmouth, Norfolk.
Busy	United States	The ship was driven ashore at Cape Henry, Virginia. She was on a voyage from Buenos Aires, Argentina to Baltimore, Maryland.
Caledonia	United Kingdom	The ship ran aground on the Goodwin Sands, Kent. She was on a voyage from Alexandria, Egypt to Hull, Yorkshire. She was refloated and assisted in to Ramsgate, Kent in a severely leaky condition.
David Cannon	United States	The ship was lost off the Chandeleur Islands, Louisiana. Her crew were rescued. She was on a voyage from New Orleans, Louisiana to Liverpool, Lancashire.
G. T. Ward	United Kingdom	The ship was driven ashore Boulmer, Northumberland. She was on a voyage from Wisbech, Cambridgeshire to South Shields, County Durham.
Lava, and an unnamed dredge boat	United Kingdom	The steamship Lava ran into an unnamed dredge boat in the River Suir and sank her. Lava ran aground. She was refloated and resumed her voyage.
Leading Star	United Kingdom	The ship was driven ashore south of Flamborough Head, Glamorgan. She was on a voyage from London to Dundee, Forfarshire. She was refloated on 20 January and towed in to South Shields, County Durham for repairs.
Maria	United Kingdom	The brig ran aground on the Corton Sands, in the North Sea off the coast of Suffolk. She was on a voyage from Newcastle upon Tyne, Northumberland to Porto, Portugal. She was later refloated and taken in to Great Yarmouth in a leaky condition.
Thames	United Kingdom	The ship ran aground off Muck Island, in the Larne Lough and was consequently beached on the coast of County Antrim. Thames was on a voyage from Belfast, County Antrim to Savannah, Georgia, United States. Although condemned, she was refloated on 8 February and towed in to Belfast, County Antrim.

== 17 January ==
List of shipwrecks: 17 January 1869
Ship	State	Description
Jacquarine	Brazil	The steamship wrecked upstream of "Conception".
Isabella and Mary	United Kingdom	The schooner was run down and sunk in the North Sea off the coast of Suffolk by the steamship Busy Bee (United Kingdom). Her seven crew were rescued by Busy Bee. Isabella and Mary was on a voyage from Amble, Northumberland to Boulogne, Pas-de-Calais, France.
Nautilus	United Kingdom	The ship was wrecked on the Holm Sand, in the North Sea off the coast of Suffolk. Her crew were rescued.
Sea Foam	United Kingdom	The ship ran aground on the Longsand, in the North Sea off the coast of Essex. She was on a voyage from Sulina, Ottoman Empire to Ipswich, Suffolk. She was refloated, found to be severely leaky and was beached on the Platters.
Unnamed	Flag unknown	The smack was run into by the brig Nimrod (United Kingdom) and sank off Spurn Point, Yorkshire with the loss of all hands.

== 18 January ==
List of shipwrecks: 18 January 1869
Ship	State	Description
Ann	United Kingdom	The schooner foundered in the Bristol Channel off the Nash Lighthouse, Glamorgan. Her crew were rescued. She was on a voyage from Bristol, Gloucestershire to Pernambuco, Brazil.
Glencoe	United Kingdom	The ship ran aground at Dungeness, Kent. She was on a voyage from London to Kurrachee, India. Glencoe was refloated and put into The Downs. She subsequently resumed her voyage.
M. Racer	United Kingdom	The brig was damaged by fire at West Hartlepool, County Durham.
Stranger	United Kingdom	The schooner collided with the steamship Beverley (United Kingdom) and sank off the Boston Knock. Her crew were rescued by Beverley.

== 19 January ==
List of shipwrecks: 19 January 1869
Ship	State	Description
Aberdeenshire	United Kingdom	The steamship ran aground at Ramsgate, Kent. She was refloated.
Aldivalloch	United Kingdom	The barque foundered 40 nautical miles (74 km) off Cape St. Vincent, Portugal. Her crew were rescued by Meggy Armstrong (United Kingdom) and a Russian barque. Aldivalloch was on a voyage from Bourgas, Ottoman Empire to Falmouth, Cornwall.
Ann	United States	The ship was driven ashore at Berck, Pas-de-Calais, France. She was on a voyage from New York to Antwerp, Belgium.
Queen of the Lakes	United Kingdom	The ship ran aground at Liverpool, Lancashire. She was on a voyage from Liverpool to Corrientes, Argentina.
Union	United States	The sternwheel paddle steamer sank in the Lafayette rapids on the Dayton River in Oregon. Her boiler later was salvaged.

== 20 January ==
List of shipwrecks: 20 January 1869
Ship	State	Description
Ala	Norway	The ship was wrecked at Skeldaness, Shetland Islands, United Kingdom. Her crew were rescued. She was on a voyage from Dram to Liverpool, Lancashire, United Kingdom.
Europa	United Kingdom	The ship was driven ashore at Cromer, Norfolk. She was on a voyage from the River Tyne to Livorno, Italy. She was refloated and towed in to Great Yarmouth, Norfolk.
Favourite	United Kingdom	The fishing smack was driven ashore at Speeton, Yorkshire. She was refloated and taken in to Scarborough, Yorkshire in a severely leaky condition.
Galvanic	United Kingdom	The steamship ran aground at Crosby, Lancashire. She was on a voyage from Belfast, County Antrim to Liverpool. She was refloated and taken in to Liverpool.
Gustav	Hamburg	The ship ran aground on the Sunk Sand, in the North Sea off the coast of Essex, United Kingdom. She was on a voyage from Hamburg to Saint Thomas, Virgin Islands. She was refloated with the assistance of four smacks and taken in to Harwich, Essex.
Harriet and Eliza	United Kingdom	The Mersey Flat was run into by the steamship Milo in the Crosby Channel and was abandoned by her crew, who were rescued by Milo. Harriet and Eliza was taken in to by a tug.
Success	United Kingdom	The ship was driven ashore at Flamborough Head, Yorkshire. She was on a voyage from Great Yarmouth, Norfolk to Seaham, County Durham.

== 21 January ==
List of shipwrecks: 21 January 1869
Ship	State	Description
Eden, and Flying Fish	United Kingdom	The barque Flying Fish was run into by Eden (United Kingdom) and sank. Her crew were rescued by a steamship. She was on a voyage from the River Tyne to Exeter, Devon. Eden was on a voyage from Callao, Peru to Aberdeen. She was severely damaged.
Kinloss	United Kingdom	The schooner was wrecked off Scatraw Creek. Her four crew were rescued by a coble.
Mary Ellen	United Kingdom	The ship ran aground on the Barrells. She was on a voyage from Liverpool, Lancashire to Jamaica. She was refloated and put back to Liverpool in a leaky condition.
Scotia	United Kingdom	The steamship was wrecked at Tynemouth, Northumberland. Her crew were rescued. She was on a voyage from Grangemouth, Stirlingshire to Newcastle upon Tyne, Northumberland.

== 22 January ==
List of shipwrecks: 22 January 1869
Ship	State	Description
Anna Helena	Prussia	The ship caught fire and was run ashore at Trimingham, Norfolk, United Kingdom.
Coral Nymph	United Kingdom	The ship capsized at Sunderland. She was righted.
Demetrius	Flag unknown	The ship was driven ashore at Bridport, Dorset, England.
Prince Alfred	United Kingdom	The paddle steamer ran aground on the Carrick Rock, Maughold Head, Isle of Man. All on board were rescued; her 120 passengers were taken off by the steamship Magnetic (United Kingdom. Prince Alfred was on a voyage from Fleetwood, Lancashire to Belfast, County Antrim. She broke up on 30 January.
Valetta	United Kingdom	The ship ran aground on the Askew Spit, in Liverpool Bay. She was on a voyage from Liverpool, Lancashire to Cette, Hérault, France. She was refloated and put back to Liverpool.

== 23 January ==
List of shipwrecks: 23 January 1869
Ship	State	Description
Ida	United Kingdom	The ship was driven ashore and wrecked at Audierne, Finistère, France. She was on a voyage from Sunderland, County Durham to Bayonne, Basses-Pyrénées, France.
Marie Joseph	France	The ship was driven ashore at Audierne. She was on a voyage from London, United Kingdom to Bayonne. She was refloated on 13 February but was condemned.
Santiago	United Kingdom	The paddle steamer was wrecked in the Strait of Magellan with the loss of three of the 200 people on board. Survivors were rescued by HMS Nassau (Royal Navy). Santiago was on a voyage from Valparaíso to Liverpool, Lancashire, United Kingdom.

== 24 January ==
List of shipwrecks: 24 January 1869
Ship	State	Description
Carl	Rostock	The brig was wrecked on the Goodwin Sands, Kent, United Kingdom. Her crew were rescued by a lugger. She was on a voyage from Viborg, Denmark to Cette, Hérault, France. Carl was later refloated and taken in to Ramsgate, Kent in a waterlogged condition.
Lady Westmoreland	United Kingdom	The barque was wrecked on the Goodwin Sands. Her crew were rescued by a lugger. She was on a voyage from Newcastle upon Tyne, Northumberland to Cartagena, Spain. She was subsequently refloated with assistance from a lugger and a hoveller. Lady Westmoreland resumed her voyage, but put in to St. Helen's, Isle of Wight on 1 February in a leaky condition. She was taken in to Portsmouth, Hampshire for repairs on 19 February.
Vrouw Clara	Netherlands	The brig struck floating wreckage and foundered in the North Sea off the coast of County Durham, United Kingdom. Her six crew survived. She was on a voyage from Sunderland, County Durham to "Caminka", Portugal.

== 25 January ==
List of shipwrecks: 25 January 1869
Ship	State	Description
Alice and Mary	United Kingdom	The ship collided with the coaster Eaglet (United Kingdom) and sank in the River Mersey. She was on a voyage from Bangor, Caernarfonshire to Garston, Lancashire.
Magnet	United Kingdom	The ship collided with the corvette Bartolomeu Dias (Portuguese Navy) and was abandoned by her crew. She was on a voyage from Savanilla, United States of Colombia to Bremen. She was towed in to Plymouth Sound by the steamship Balbec (France).
Margaret	United Kingdom	The ship schooner was driven ashore and wrecked at Goatness, Lothian. Her crew were rescued. She was on a voyage from West Hartlepool, County Durham to Tayport, Fife.

== 26 January ==
List of shipwrecks: 26 January 1869
Ship	State	Description
Annie	United Kingdom	The ship ran aground on the Barnard Sand, in the North Sea off the coast of Suffolk. She was on a voyage from Maldon, Essex to Goole, Yorkshire. She was refloated and taken in to Lowestoft, Suffolk in a severely leaky condition.
Golden Pledge	United Kingdom	The ship departed from Liverpool, Lancashire for Castine, Maine, United States. No further trace, presumed foundered with the loss of all hands.
Mary Pester	United Kingdom	The ship was driven ashore at Black Hill. She was on a voyage from Waterford to Llanelly, Glamorgan.
Vulcan	United Kingdom	The steamship was driven ashore and wrecked on the "Island of Ross", Argyllshire.

== 28 January ==
List of shipwrecks: 28 January 1869
Ship	State	Description
Bertha	France	The schooner ran aground and sank of St Martin's, Isles of Scilly, United Kingdom. Her crew survived.
Huit Frères	France	The schooner was driven ashore on Tresco, Isles of Scilly and was wrecked.
Queen of the Tyne	United Kingdom	The brig was wrecked on the Corton Sand, in the North Sea off the coast of Suffolk. Her eight crew were rescued by the Lowestoft Lifeboat Lætitia ( Royal National Lifeboat Institution). Queen of the Tyne was on a voyage from South Shields, County Durham to London.
Veritas	Austria-Hungary	The brig was abandoned in the Atlantic Ocean. She was on a voyage from Antwerp, Belgium to Trieste. She was taken in to Falmouth, Cornwall, United Kingdom by the three crew from the schooner Capricieuse (France) with assistance from the Cadgwith Lifeboat Western Commercial Traveller ( Royal National Lifeboat Institution).
Wave	United Kingdom	The ship ran aground on the Longsand, in the North Sea off the coast of Essex. She was on a voyage from Truro, Cornwall to Mistley, Essex. She was refloated and taken in to Harwich, Essex.
Wellington	United Kingdom	The brigantine ran aground of the Cross Rocks, off Skerries, County Dublin. She was on a voyage from Maryport, Cumberland to Dublin. She was refloated the next day and taken in to Skerries.

== 29 January ==
List of shipwrecks: 29 January 1869
Ship	State	Description
Anne Middleton	United Kingdom	The brig departed from Agrigento, Sicily, Italy for Ipswich, Suffolk. No further trace, presumed foundered with the loss of all eight crew.
Carron	United Kingdom	The ship was driven onto the Black Rocks and was damaged. She was on a voyage from Berdyansk, Russia to Leith, Lothian. She was refloated and taken in to Leith.
Demetrius	United Kingdom	The ship was driven ashore and wrecked at Bridport, Dorset. Her crew were rescued. She was on a voyage from Topsham, Devon to Middlesbrough, Yorkshire.
Halcyon	United Kingdom	The smack was driven ashore at Moville, County Donegal.
Macedon	United Kingdom	The steamship was driven ashore on Piel Island, Lancashire. She was on a voyage from Barrow in Furness, Lancashire to Lisbon, Portugal. She was refloated and taken in to Barrow in Furness for repairs.
Storm Queen	United Kingdom	The steamship foundered in the English Channel 7 nautical miles (13 km) west of Rame Head, Cornwall. Her thirteen crew were rescued by Rogaland (Norway). Storm Queen was on a voyage from Neath, Glamorgan to Dieppe, Seine-Inférieure, France.
Tabitha	United Kingdom	The schooner was driven ashore and wrecked at Hartlepool, County Durham. She was on a voyage from Hartlepool to Scarborough, Yorkshire.
Twilight	United States	The fishing schooner sank off Beaver Island. Crew saved. Later it was determined she was scuttled by her Captain.
Willing Lass	United Kingdom	The schooner was wrecked on the Pladda Rocks with the loss of all four crew.

== 30 January ==
List of shipwrecks: 30 January 1869
Ship	State	Description
Ann Middleton	United Kingdom	The ship departed from Agrigento, Sicily, Italy for Ipswich, Suffolk. No further trace, presumed foundered with the loss of all hands.
Barbarossa	United Kingdom	The ship was sighted in the Atlantic Ocean whilst on a voyage from Queenstown, County Cork to Stockton-on-Tees, County Durham. No further trace, presumed foundered with the loss of all hands.
Charles and Emma	United Kingdom	The ship collided with another vessel and sank at Falmouth, Cornwall. She was on a voyage from Antwerp, Belgium to Corfu, Greece and Trieste.
Flying Fish	United Kingdom	The ship was driven ashore at Milford Haven, Pembrokeshire. She was on a voyage from Neath, Glamorgan to New Ross, County Wexford.
Margam Abbey	United Kingdom	The steamship was wrecked on São Miguel Island, Azores. Her crew were rescued.
Sir George Brown	United Kingdom	The ship was driven ashore and wrecked at Dunfanaghy, County Donegal. Her crew were rescued.
Turtle Dove	United Kingdom	The smack was driven ashore at Milford Haven, Pembrokeshire. She was refloated the next day.

== 31 January ==
List of shipwrecks: 31 January 1869
Ship	State	Description
Betsey	United Kingdom	The schooner ran aground on the Gaa Sands, at the mouth of the River Tay and was damaged. She was on a voyage from Sunderland, County Durham to Dundee, Forfarshire. She was refloated and taken in to Dundee, where she struck the quayside and was damaged further.
Charles Emma	France	The brig sank at Falmouth, Cornwall, United Kingdom. Her crew were rescued.
Choice	United Kingdom	The brig was driven ashore at Praa Sands, Cornwall with the loss of three of her eleven crew. Survivors were rescued by rocket apparatus.
Horace	United Kingdom	The ship was wrecked on the Corton Sand, in the North Sea off the coast of Suffolk. Her crew were rescued. She was on a voyage from Fécamp, Seine-Inférieure, France to Great Yarmouth, Norfolk.
John Bull	United Kingdom	The Mersey Flat was run into by the ferry Wild Rose (United Kingdom) in the River Mersey and was severely damaged. She was beached at Seacombe, Cheshire.
Lady Alice Hill	United Kingdom	The steamship ran aground in the River Foyle 2 nautical miles (3.7 km) downstream of Londonderry. She was on a voyage from Troon, Ayrshire to Londonderry.
Lady Londesborough	United Kingdom	The barque was wrecked near Kilmore, County Wexford. Her crew were rescued. She was on a voyage from Huelva, Spain to Liverpool, Lancashire.
Libertas	Italy	The barque ran aground and sank on the Scroby Sands, Norfolk. Her crew were rescued by the Great Yarmouth Lifeboat Mark Lane ( Royal National Lifeboat Institution). She was on a voyage from Newcastle upon Tyne, Northumberland, United Kingdom to Genoa.
Marie et Eugenie	United Kingdom	The chasse-marée ran aground at the Haslar Hospital, Portsmouth, Hampshire, United Kingdom. She was on a voyage from Pontrieux, Côtes-du-Nord to Brest, Finistère. She was refloated with the assistance of a tug and taken in to Portsmouth in a leaky condition.
Padarn	United Kingdom	The schooner foundered off Start Point, Devon with the loss of all hands. She was on a voyage from an English port to Caen, Calvados, France.
Paul	France	The brig departed from the Dardanelles whilst on a voyage from Odesa, Russia to Marseille, Bouches-du-Rhône. No further trace, presumed foundered in the Mediterranean Sea with the loss of all hands.
Red Jacket	United Kingdom	The Mersey Flat was driven ashore at Beaumaris, Anglesey with the loss of a crew member.
Viatka	Flag unknown	The steamship ran aground at Trieste. She was on a voyage from Venice, Italy to Trieste.
Windsor Castle	United Kingdom	The full-rigged ship foundered. There was at least one survivor. She was on a voyage from Liverpool, Lancashire to Bassein, India.
Unnamed	United Kingdom	The full-rigged ship was driven ashore at Chapman Head, Essex.

== Unknown date ==
List of shipwrecks: Unknown date in January 1869
Ship	State	Description
Adele	Bremen	The ship was destroyed by fire in the Indian Ocean before 30 January. There were at least five survivors.
Æolus	Flag unknown	The ship wrecked north of the mouth of the Rio Grande. She was on a voyage from Cardiff, Glamorgan to the Rio Grande.
Æolus	Trieste	The steamship was driven ashore near "Mirama".
A. G. Brown	United Kingdom	The steamship collided with the steamship Teutonia (Hamburg) and sank in the Mississippi River. Her crew were rescued.
Alaska	United States	The ship was damaged by fire at Havre de Grâce, Seine-Inférieure, France.
Amor	Grand Duchy of Mecklenburg-Schwerin	The brig was wrecked on the Goodwin Sands, Kent, United Kingdom. Her crew were rescued by Aid (United Kingdom) and the Ramsgate Lifeboat Bradford ( Royal National Lifeboat Institution).
Atlas	United Kingdom	The ship was driven ashore by ice at Stettin.
Bellcarrigg	United Kingdom	The ship was destroyed by fire in the Indian Ocean. Her crew were rescued by the barque Larnax (United Kingdom). Bellcarrigg was on a voyage from Sunderland, County Durham to Bombay, India.
Black Prince	United Kingdom	The smack was wrecked on the Cross Sand, in the North Sea off the coast of Norfolk before 4 January. Her crew were rescued by the steamship Seahorse (United Kingdom).
Colorado	United Kingdom	The brig ran aground on a reef off the cost of Florida, United States. She was on voyage from Cienfuegos, Cuba to Boston, Massachusetts or New York.
Coral Nymph	United Kingdom	The ship was driven ashore at Dungeness, Kent before 22 January. She was on a voyage from Shanghai, China to Sunderland. She was refloated and completed her voyage.
HMS Cracker	Royal Navy	The ship ran aground at least once off the south east coast of the United States during January.
Estrella	Flag unknown	The steamship was wrecked on Rocque's Reef. Her crew were rescued. She was on a voyage from Saint Thomas, Virgin Islands to La Guaira, Venezuela.
Forest Belle	United States	The fishing schooner possibly sank in a gale on the Georges Bank in January, she sailed from Gloucester, Massachusetts in November, 1868 on her maiden voyage and vanished. Lost with all 12 hands.
Generous	United Kingdom	The ship was run down and sunk in the Baltic Sea by the steamship Garrison (United Kingdom) 18 nautical miles (33 km) west of the "Wingo Lighthouse". Her crew were rescued by Garrison. She was on a voyage from Danzig to Leith, Lothian.
Glide	United States	The sternwheel paddle steamer was destroyed by a boiler explosion.
Golondrina	Flag unknown	The ship caught fire off Cape Horn, Chile and was abandoned. She was on a voyage from Portland to Valparaíso, Chile.
Gosford	United Kingdom	The ship was wrecked on the Goodwin Sands. She was on a voyage from Saint-Malo, Ille-et-Vilaine to London.
Hannah Law	United Kingdom	The ship caught fire at Bombay before 13 January and was scuttled. She was on a voyage from Birkenhead, Cheshire to Bombay.
Harriet	United Kingdom	The ship was wrecked on the Goodwin Sands. Her crew were rescued.
Hermine	France	The ship was wrecked at Tampico, Mexico. She was on a voyage from Bordeaux, Gironde to Tampico.
Highland Chief	United Kingdom	The barque was wrecked on the Goodwin Sands with the loss of five of the nineteen people on board. Survivors were rescued by the Ramsgate Lifeboat Bradford ( Royal National Lifeboat Institution).
Hope	United Kingdom	The brig was wrecked on the Goodwin Sands. Her crew were rescued.
John Bright	United Kingdom	The barque was wrecked on Vancouver Island, Colony of British Columbia. She was on a voyage from Port Ludlow, Washington Territory to a port in Chile.
USS Kansas	United States Navy	The gunboat ran aground at Valparaíso before 18 January.
HMIS Marge	(British Raj) Bombay Marine	The steamship was lost in a typhoon near Saigon, French Indochina before 14 January with the loss of all hands.
Mexico	United Kingdom	The schooner was wrecked at "Tobasco".
Novice	United Kingdom	The smack foundered before 11 January with the loss of all hands.
Orion	United Kingdom	The steamship was wrecked on the Goodwin Sands before 19 January.
Secret	United Kingdom	The hoveller was lost in the North Sea with the loss of all seven crew. She may have been run down and sunk by a steamship.
Start	United Kingdom	The oyster dredger was wrecked on the Goodwin Sands. Her crew were rescued.
Surprise	United States	The ship was driven ashore on the Chinese coast and was severely damaged. She was on a voyage from Foo Chow Foo, China to New York.
Tavistock	United Kingdom	The schooner was abandoned off the east Kent coast. She was taken in to Ramsgate by the Ramsgate Lifeboat Bradford ( Royal National Lifeboat Institution).
Thomas & Wilson	United Kingdom	The sloop was wrecked on the Goodwin Sands. Her crew were rescued.
Union	United Kingdom	The ship was abandoned. She was on a voyage from St. George to Jamaica.
Zephyr	United Kingdom	The ship departed from Exmouth, Devon in late January. No further trace, presumed foundered with the loss of all hands.
