= HMS Charwell =

Four ships of the Royal Navy have borne the name HMS Charwell (or Cherwell), after the River Cherwell, a tributary of the River Thames:

- HMS Charwell was the 18-gun French corvette Aurore, which HMS Thames captured in 1801. She was sold in 1813.
- HMS Charwell was the 16-gun ship-sloop HMS Earl of Moira, launched in 1805 on the Great Lakes, and renamed Charwell in 1814. She was sold in 1837.
- HMS Cherwell (1903) was a destroyer launched in 1903 and sold in 1919.
- HMS Cherwell was a Mersey-class Royal Navy trawler launched as HMS James Jones in 1918, renamed Cherwell in 1920, used as a boom-defense vessel in 1942, and sold in 1946.
