= HMS Colchester =

Six ships of the Royal Navy have been named HMS Colchester, after the town of Colchester:

- English ship Colchester (1654) was a 24-gun ship launched in 1654 and sunk in action in 1666.
- HMS Colchester (1664) was an 8-gun ketch launched in 1664 and captured by the French in 1667.
- HMS Colchester (1694) was a 48-gun fourth-rate frigate launched in 1694. She foundered in 1704.
- HMS Colchester (1707) was a 54-gun fourth-rate frigate launched in 1707, rebuilt in 1721 and broken up in 1742.
- HMS Colchester (1744) was a 50-gun fourth-rate frigate launched in 1744 and wrecked later that year on the Kentish Knock.
- HMS Colchester (1746) was a 50-gun fourth-rate frigate launched in 1746 and broken up in 1773.
- HMS Colchester (1918) was built for the Great Eastern Railway as a cargo ship and requisitioned in 1942 as a wreck dispersal vessel.
- HMS Colchester Castle was a planned Castle-class corvette, cancelled in 1943.
