= HMS Ceanothus =

Two ships of the Royal Navy have borne the name HMS Ceanothus. Ceanothus comes from the Greek word keanthos, meaning a type of thistle.

- HMS Ceanothus (1917) was an Anchusa-class sloop launched in 1917. In 1921 she was transferred to the Royal Indian Marine and renamed HMINS Elphinstone. She was wrecked on 29 January 1925 off the Nicobar Islands.
- HMS Ceanothus (K486) was a modified Flower-class corvette launched in 1943. She was transferred in the same year to the Royal Canadian Navy and renamed HMCS Forrest Hill. She was sold for scrap in 1948.
