= HMCS Forest Hill =

Royal Canadian Navy modified Flower-class corvette

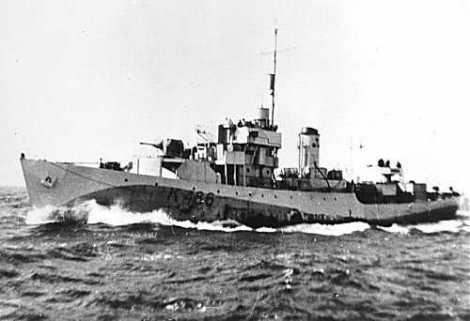
- HMCS Forest Hill

History

Canada
- Name: HMCS Forest Hill
- Namesake: Forest Hill, Ontario
- Ordered: 22 July 1942
- Builder: Ferguson Bros. Ltd., Port Glasgow
- Laid down: 5 February 1943
- Launched: 30 August 1943
- Commissioned: 1 December 1943
- Decommissioned: 9 July 1945
- Identification: Pennant number: K486
- Honours and awards: Atlantic 1944
- Fate: Scrapped 1948

General characteristics
- Class & type: Flower-class corvette (modified)
- Displacement: 1,015 long tons (1,031 t; 1,137 short tons)
- Length: 208 ft (63.40 m)o/a
- Beam: 33 ft (10.06 m)
- Draught: 11 ft (3.35 m)
- Propulsion: single shaft, 2 × oil fired water tube boilers, 1 × triple-expansion reciprocating steam engine, 2,750 ihp (2,050 kW)
- Speed: 16 knots (29.6 km/h)
- Range: 3,500 nautical miles (6,482 km) at 12 knots (22.2 km/h)
- Complement: 90
- Sensors & processing systems: One Type 271 SW2C radar, one Type 144 sonar
- Armament: 1 × 4 in (102 mm) BL Mk.IX single gun; 1 × 2-pounder Mk.VIII single "pom-pom"; 2 × 20 mm Oerlikon single; 1 × Hedgehog A/S mortar; 4 × Mk.II depth charge throwers; 2 Depth charge rails with 70 depth charges

HMCS Forest Hill (a.k.a. HMCS Forrest Hill) was a modified Flower-class corvette that served with the Royal Canadian Navy during the Second World War. She served primarily as a convoy escort in the Battle of the Atlantic. She was originally laid down by the Royal Navy as HMS Ceanothos but was never commissioned into the RN, being transferred to the RCN before completion. She is named for Forest Hill, Ontario, a town that was eventually amalgamated into the larger city Toronto, Ontario.

== Background ==
Flower-class corvettes like Forrest Hill serving with the Royal Canadian Navy during the Second World War were different from earlier and more traditional sail-driven corvettes. The "corvette" designation was created by the French as a class of small warships; the Royal Navy borrowed the term for a period but discontinued its use in 1877. During the hurried preparations for war in the late 1930s, Winston Churchill reactivated the corvette class, needing a name for smaller ships used in an escort capacity, in this case based on a whaling ship design. The generic name "flower" was used to designate the class of these ships, which – in the Royal Navy – were named after flowering plants.

Corvettes commissioned by the Royal Canadian Navy during the Second World War were named after communities for the most part, to better represent the people who took part in building them. This idea was put forth by Admiral Percy W. Nelles. Sponsors were commonly associated with the community for which the ship was named. Royal Navy corvettes were designed as open sea escorts, while Canadian corvettes were developed for coastal auxiliary roles which was exemplified by their minesweeping gear. Eventually the Canadian corvettes would be modified to allow them to perform better on the open seas.

== Construction ==
Ceanothos was ordered 22 July 1942 as part of the Royal Navy 1942–43 Increased Endurance Flower-class building program. She was laid down 5 February 1943 by Ferguson Bros. Ltd. at Port Glasgow, Scotland and launched 30 August 1943. As part of an exchange for Algerine-class minesweepers that the RCN intended to use as convoy escorts, the Royal Navy transferred four Flower-class corvettes and twelve Castle-class corvettes to Canada in order to acquire them. Ceanothos was transferred on 1 December 1943 and commissioned as HMCS Forrest Hill into the RCN on the River Clyde. The only significant differences between the RCN and RN 1942–43 Flower classes was a shortened mainmast and varying anti-aircraft armament.

During her career, Forrest Hill had one significant refit. It took place at Liverpool, Nova Scotia from December 1944 until February 1945.

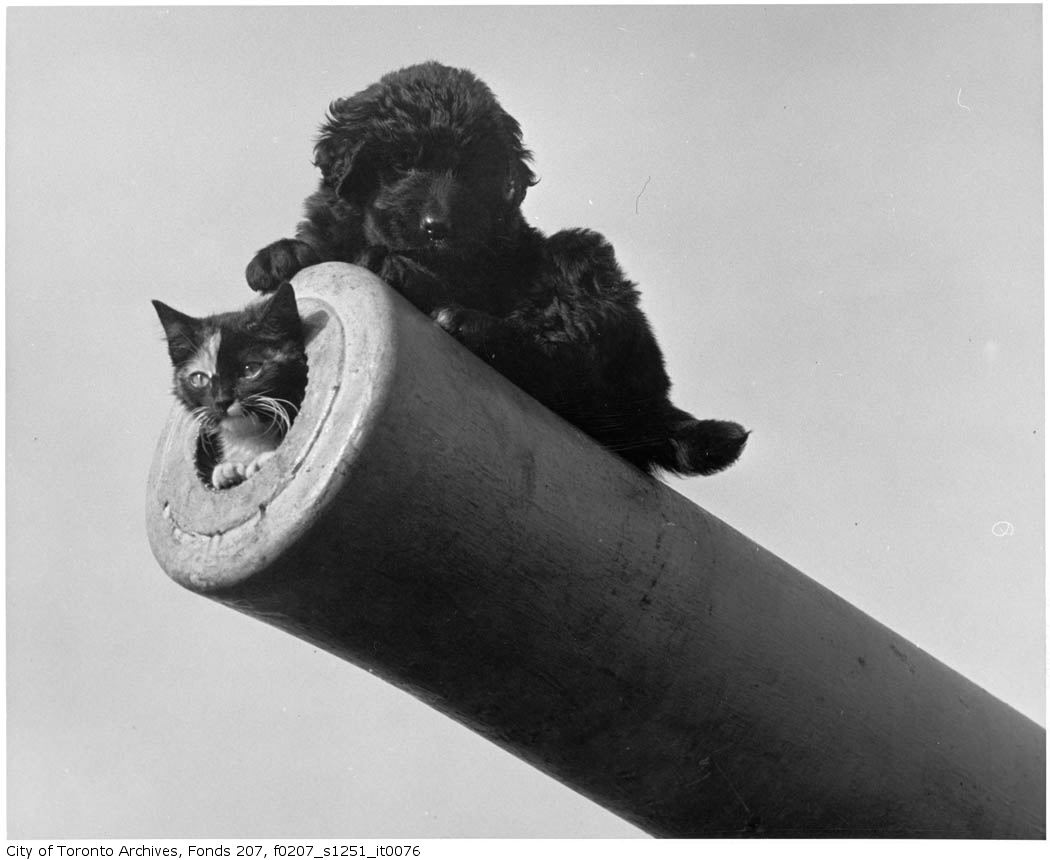
Forest Hill's ship's mascots, "Sad-Sad" the kitten and "Screech" the dog

== Service history ==
After commissioning, Forrest Hill was sent to work up at Tobermory, the location of the Royal Navy's convoy escort training centre. After working up, she was assigned to the Mid-Ocean Escort Force as a trans-Atlantic convoy escort. She was allocated to escort group C-4 and served with the group until departing for refit in December 1944.

After the refit she worked up in Bermuda. Upon her return she was assigned to Halifax Force in April 1945 as a local escort and patrol duty. She remained with the unit until the end of the war.

Forrest Hill was paid off 9 July 1945 at Sorel, Quebec. She was transferred to the War Assets Corporation and sold for scrapping. She was broken up in 1948 at Hamilton, Ontario.
