= HMS Cretan =

Two ships of the Royal Navy have been named HMS Cretan.

- HMS Cretan was the French Navy's brig Nettuno launched at Venice in 1807 that the Royal Navy captured in 1808 and named Cretan; She was sold in 1814 and then between 1815 and 1831 she made five voyages as a whaler.
- HMS Cretan was a C-class destroyer built for the Royal Navy as HMS Cromwell, launched in 1946, and initially was to have been called Cretan. She was sold to the Royal Norwegian Navy in 1946 and renamed HNoMS Bergen (1946). She was scrapped in 1967.
