= HMS Cherub =

Two ships of the Royal Navy have been named HMS Cherub, after the cherub:

- HMS Cherub (1806) was an 18-gun Royal Navy Cormorant-class sloop built in Dover in 1806 and sold in 1820.
- HMS Cherub (1865) was a Britomart-class wood screw gunboat launched in 1865 and sold in 1890 for breaking up.
