= HMS Courageous =

HMS Courageous or Courageux (the French spelling) may refer to one of several ships of the Royal Navy:

- HMS Courageux (1761), a 74-gun ship of the line captured from the French on 13 August 1761, and wrecked on the coast of Morocco 19 Dec 1796.
- HMS Courageux, or Courageuse, was a 32-gun sailing frigate captured from the French in June 1799. She was renamed Lutine in November 1799 and used as a prison ship at Gibraltar. Sold in April 1802 and broken up in Malta.
- HMS Courageux (1800), a 74-gun third rate launched in 1800, laid up in 1814, and later in use as a lazaretto. Broken up 1832.
- HMS Courageous (50), a Courageous-class battlecruiser, converted to an aircraft carrier (Courageous class) in 1924; sunk by U-29 in September 1939 southwest of Ireland in the Celtic Sea.
- HMS Courageous (S50), a Churchill-class nuclear powered fleet submarine in service from 1971 to 1993, and presently on display at Plymouth.

== Battle honours ==
Ships named Courageous have earned the following battle honours:

- Falkland Islands, 1982
