= HMS Cavendish =

HMS Cavendish has been the name of two Royal Navy ships:

- HMS Cavendish (1918), a Hawkins-class cruiser built in 1918, renamed HMS Vindictive, and converted to an aircraft carrier
- HMS Cavendish (R15), a C-class destroyer built in 1944
