= HMS Clematis =

Two ships of the Royal Navy have been named HMS Clematis :

- HMS Clematis (1915) an Azalea-class sloop launched in 1915 and sold in 1931
- HMS Clematis (K36), a Flower-class corvette launched in 1940 and sold in 1949
