= HMS Convolvulus =

Two ships of the Royal Navy have borne the name HMS Convolvulus, after the flower:

- HMS Convolvulus (1917) was an Anchusa-class sloop launched in 1917 and sold in 1922.
- HMS Convolvulus (K45) was a Flower-class corvette launched in 1940 and sold in 1947 for breaking up.
