= HMS Cleveland =

Two ships of the Royal Navy have been named HMS Cleveland:

- HMS Cleveland (1671) was a Royal Yacht launched in 1671 at Portsmouth Dockyard. She was sold in 1716.
- HMS Cleveland (L46) was a Hunt-class destroyer launched in 1940 and stranded while under tow to be scrapped in 1957.
