= HMS Chelmer =

Two ships of the Royal Navy have been named HMS Chelmer:

- HMS Chelmer (1904) was a River-class destroyer launched in 1904 and sold for scrap in 1920
- HMS Chelmer was to be the name of HMS Balsam but the ship was renamed before launching
- HMS Chelmer (K221) was a River-class frigate launched in 1943 and scrapped in 1957
