= HMS Chrysanthemum =

Two ships of the Royal Navy have been named HMS Chrysanthemum:

- HMS Chrysanthemum (1917) was an Anchusa-class sloop launched in 1917 she was decommissioned in 1988 and scrapped in 1995
- HMS Chrysanthemum (K195) was a Flower-class corvette launched in 1941 she served as Commandant Drogou in the Free French Naval Forces from completion until 1947 when after return to the Royal Navy she was sold into mercantile service
