= HMS Cromer =

HMS Cromer, after the Norfolk town of Cromer can refer to any of three Royal Navy ships:

- HMS Cromer (1867), a Britomart-class wooden screw gunboat launched in 1867 and sold in 1886 for breaking up.
- HMS Cromer (J128), a Bangor-class minesweeper lost in 1942
- HMS Cromer (M103), a Sandown-class minehunter launched in 1990 and decommissioned in 2001. Converted to a static harbour training ship in Dartmouth, Hindostan.

== See also ==
- HMS Cromer Castle
