= English ship Convertine =

Three ships of the Royal Navy and its predecessors have been named Convertine:

- English ship Convertine (1620) was a 34-gun ship launched in 1616 as Destiny and renamed to Convertine in 1620.
- English ship Convertine (1648) was a 40-gun middling ship.
- English ship Convertine (1650) was a 40-gun fourth-rate ship of the line acquired in October 1650. She was captured by the Dutch in 1666.
