= HMS Chamois =

Two ships of the Royal Navy have been named HMS Chamois after the mountain goat of the same name:

- HMS Chamois (1896) was a Palmer three funnel, 30 knot destroyer launched in 1896 and lost in the Gulf of Patras in 1904 when she foundered after her own broken propeller blade pierced her hull.
- HMS Chamois (J28) was a Lend-Lease Catherine-class minesweeper launched in 1942 and damaged by a mine in 1944. She was returned to the US Navy in 1946 and broken up in 1950.
