= HMS Charlestown =

Several ships of the British Royal Navy have been named HMS Charlestown

- HMS Charlestown, was USS Boston (1777), which the British captured on 12 May 1780. Charlestown struck to the French frigates Astrée and Hermione off Île Royale at the action of 21 July 1781, but they were unable to take possession of her. In November 1781, the ship fell in with the privateer Thorn. She remained in the Royal Navy until sold in 1783.
- HMS Charlestown (I21), a Town-class destroyer received from the US Navy in 1940 and decommissioned in 1945.
