= HMS Cacafogo =

One to three vessels may have served the British Royal Navy under the name Cacafogo, or Cacafoga, or Cacafuago, or Cacafuego, all being colloquial Spanish for "Spitshit" or "Shitfire".

Mortar vessel: The first mention of a Cacafuego occurred in 1797. Rear-Admiral Horatio Nelson's flotilla at the Battle of Santa Cruz de Tenerife (1797) contained a mortar vessel. By some accounts the name of the mortar vessel was Ray; other records give it as Cacafuego. Both are possible, though Ray does not appear in the National Maritime Museum's (NMM) database as being at Santa Cruz, though Cacafuago does, and there is no mention of any Ray prior to the 20th century. The flotilla under Nelson, in Theseus, had captured two mortar boats and an armed launch at Cadiz in an action on 5 July.

Gunboat: A letter dated 11 January 1799 exists from Admiral Vincent at Gibraltar to the Officers of Ordnance concerning the supply of a 24-pounder gun for the gunboat Cacafogo. The NMM database lists a gunboat Cacafuego being commissioned in the Mediterranean in 1799. It further reports that Lieutenant Benjamin Symes commanded her from 1803 to 1804. Lieutenant Symes died in 1804. He had apparently been appointed to HMS Hunter, but it is not clear if he had joined her.

In 1806 the gunboat Cacafoga sent into Gibraltar Alert, Hanson, master, a Danish vessel that had been sailing from Malaga to Flensburg.

Cacafogo, of two guns, was under the command of Lieutenant Richard Cull on 25 March 1809 when she was wrecked. She had been sent to Tangier to deliver dispatches. She arrived there on 25 March and sailed the same evening for Gibraltar with mail for the Rear Admiral at Cadiz. By morning she was south of Gibraltar working her way to Europa Point to enter the Bay. She came too close to land and despite her attempts too tack or use her sweeps, she was driven on to the rocks some 300 yards from the Point and was bilged.

The mortar vessel and the gunboat may have been the same vessel. Hepper describes the gunboat as having been purchased in 1797. Lyon too treats both as the same vessel.

Prison ship: Cacafogo was a hired prison ship of 366 tons (bm) that served from 6 February 1808 to 1 November 1809. She then was transferred to the Transport Board.
