= HMS Colchester (1664) =

History

England
- Name: Colchester
- Ordered: 1664
- Builder: Allin, Colchester
- Launched: 1664
- Commissioned: 1665
- Captured: 1668

General characteristics
- Class & type: 8-gun ketch
- Tons burthen: 793
- Length: 48 ft (15 m) (keel)
- Beam: 16 ft (4.9 m)
- Depth of hold: 7 ft 6 in (2.3 m)
- Armament: 6 sakers, 2 minions

HMS Colchester was an 8-gun ketch of the English navy, launched at Colchester in 1664. She was one of a generation of five ketches ordered in 1664, the others being HMS Roe, HMS Wivenhoe, HMS Deptford, and HMS Portsmouth.

HMS Colchester was commissioned in 1665 under Captain Thomas Langley. In 1666, she was placed under the command of Captain William Martin for an expedition to search for the Northwest Passage. She was captured at sea by the French on 24 March 1668.
