= HMS Coreopsis =

Three ships of the Royal Navy have borne the name HMS Coreopsis, named after the flowering plant coreopsis.

- HMS Coreopsis (1917), an Anchusa-class sloop of the First World War
- HM Drifter Coreopsis II, an armed drifter credited with sinking the German submarine SM UB-85 in April 1918
- HMS Coreopsis (K32), a Flower-class corvette of the Second World War which appeared in the 1953 film The Cruel Sea.
