= HMS Cyclamen =

Two ships of the Royal Navy have been named HMS Cyclamen :

- HMS Cyclamen (1916) an Arabis-class sloop launched in 1916 and sold in 1932
- HMS Cyclamen (K83), a Flower-class corvette launched in 1940 and sold into mercantile service as Southern Briar in 1947. She was wrecked in 1966 en route for scrapping
