= HMS Calder =

Three vessels of the Royal Navy have been named HMS Calder after Admiral Sir Robert Calder, a contemporary of Admiral Nelson:

- HMS Calder was to have been a Captain-class frigate launched at Mare Island in 1942, but the vessel was retained by the United States, and commissioned into the United States Navy as USS Gilmore.
- HMS Calder was to have been another Captain-class frigate launched at Mare Island in 1942, but the vessel was retained by the United States, and commissioned into the United States Navy as USS Finnegan.
- HMS Calder (K349) was another Captain-class frigate, launched at Bethlehem Hingham Shipyard on 27 February 1943 and provided to the Royal Navy under Lend-Lease. It was returned to the United States in October 1945 and scrapped in 1948.
