= HMS Carnation =

Four ships of the Royal Navy have borne the name HMS Carnation.

- HMS Carnation (1807) was a Cruizer-class brig-sloop launched in 1807, but captured by the French in 1808, and burnt by the British in 1809.
- HMS Carnation (1813) was another Cruizer-class brig-sloop, launched in 1813, and sunk as a target in 1867.
- HMS Carnation (1915) was a Azalea-class sloop, launched in 1915, and sold for breaking up in 1922.
- HMS Carnation (K00) was a Flower-class corvette, launched in 1940, which served in the Royal Netherlands Navy as Friso from 1943 to 1945, and later as a merchant ship.
