= HMS Campbell =

Two ships of the Royal Navy have been named HMS Campbell:

- HMS Campbell (1796) was a schooner purchased in the West Indies in 1796 and sold in 1803.
- HMS Campbell (D60) was an Admiralty type (or Scott-class) flotilla leader, launched in 1918, which served in the Second World War before being sold for scrap in 1947.
