= HMS Chance =

Two vessels of the Royal Navy have been named HMS Chance:

- HMS Galgo (1799) was a Jamaican privateer that the Spanish Navy captured in 1797 and named Galgo Inglés (English greyhound), and that the British captured in November 1799. In her brief career she detained, took, or destroyed a number of small prizes before October 1800, when she foundered, with the loss of most of her crew and passengers. The Admiralty had intended to rename her HMS Chance, but she was lost before the change could take effect.
- HMS Chance (J12) was an Auk-class minesweeper launched by Associated SB, Seattle, on 27 November 1942. She was transferred to the UK on Lend Lease on 13 November 1943, where she was classified as a Catherine-class minesweeper. The UK returned her to the United States Navy in 1946, who sold her in March to the Turkish Navy, which named her Edremit. The Turkish Navy withdrew her from service in 1973.
