= HMS Cricket =

Two ships and a shore establishment of the Royal Navy have borne the name HMS Cricket, after the cricket, an insect native to Britain:

- HMS Cricket (1906) was a Cricket-class coastal destroyer, launched in 1906. She was re-rated as a 1st-class torpedo boat that year and renamed TB 1. She was sold in 1920.
- HMS Cricket (1915) was an Insect-class gunboat, launched in 1915. She was used as a minesweeper from 1939 and gunboat from 1940, before being scrapped in 1942.
- HMS Cricket (shore establishment) was a shore establishment in Hampshire, commissioned in 1943 and paid off in 1946.
