= HMS Curzon =

Two ships of the Royal Navy have been named HMS Curzon :

- HMS Curzon (K513) was a Captain-class frigate built in the US during World War II and provided to the British under the Lend-Lease Agreement.
- HMS Curzon (M1136) was a Ton-class minesweeper which carried this name between 1960 and 1975.
