= HMS Chichester =

Six ships of the Royal Navy have borne the name HMS Chichester, after the city of Chichester:

- HMS Chichester (1695) was an 80-gun second rate launched in 1695. She was rebuilt in 1706 and broken up in 1749.
- HMS Chichester (1753) was a 70-gun third rate launched in 1753 and broken up in 1803.
- HMS Chichester (1785) was a 44-gun fifth rate launched in 1785. She became a storeship in 1799, was lent to the West India Dock Company as a training ship, and was broken up in 1815.
- HMS Chichester was a 26-gun storeship, formerly the French corvette Var, launched in 1806 and captured in 1809; Chichester was wrecked in 1811.
- HMS Chichester (1843) was a 52-gun fourth rate launched in 1843, but laid up that year. She was lent as a training ship in 1866 and was sold in 1889.
- HMS Chichester (F59) was a Salisbury-class frigate launched in 1955 and broken up in 1981.
