= HMS Cicero =

Two ships of the Royal Navy have borne the name HMS Cicero:

- HMS Cicero (1918) was a 24-class minesweeping sloop launched in 1918 and sold in 1921.
- HMS Cicero (F170) was an infantry landing ship transferred under lend-lease in 1943 as the merchant Empire Arquebus. She was commissioned HMS Cicero in 1945, returned to the Ministry of War Transport later that year as Empire Arquebus and returned to the US Navy in 1946.
