= HMS Camellia =

HMS Camellia may refer to one of two ships of the Royal Navy named after Camellia, the genus of flowering plants:

- HMS Camellia (1915), an Azalea-class sloop launched in 1915, that served in World War I and was sold in 1923.
- HMS Camellia (K31), a Flower-class corvette launched in 1940, that served in World War II and was sold in 1946.
