= HMS Churchill =

The name HMS Churchill has been borne by two Royal Navy ships: a destroyer and a submarine.

- HMS Churchill (I45) was a Town-class destroyer during World War II. It was named for towns of that name common to Britain and the United States.
- HMS Churchill (S46) was the first of three Churchill-class nuclear-powered fleet submarines. Named for Winston Churchill (Prime Minister of the United Kingdom during World War II), she was launched in 1968 and decommissioned in 1991.

== Battle honours ==
Ships named HMS Churchill have earned the following battle honours:

- Atlantic 1941–44

== See also ==
- HMCS Churchill, a Royal Canadian Navy shore establishment from 1950 to 1966.
- USS Winston S. Churchill, a destroyer in the United States Navy.
