= HMS Corso =

Two vessels of the Royal Navy have been named HMS Corso:

- HMS Corso (1796) was a Spanish brig-sloop that HMS Southampton captured on 12 February 1796. She was on harbour duty from March 1803. The Navy sold her on 1 September 1814.
- HMS Corso was a C-class destroyer of the Royal Navy, ordered as Corso during the Second World War, and was built by John I. Thornycroft & Company, Southampton. She was launched on 14 May 1945, renamed HMS Concord in June 1946, and commissioned on 20 December 1946. In 1949, she was involved in the Amethyst Incident. She was withdrawn from active service in 1957; following decommissioning she was attached to HMS Caledonia at Rosyth as a static training ship. She was broken up in October 1962.
