= HMS Chub =

Three ships of the Royal Navy have borne the name HMS Chub, or alternatively HMS Chubb, a name given to several types of fish, many in the family Cyprinidae:

- HMS Chub (1807) was a 4-gun Ballahoo-class schooner launched in 1807. She capsized in 1812.
- HMS Chubb was a schooner on the Great Lakes, the American USS Growler, which the British captured in 1813. The Americans recaptured her at the Battle of Lake Champlain and sold her in 1815.
- HMS Chub (1855) was a Cheerful-class wooden screw gunboat launched in 1855 and broken up by 1869.

== Bibliography ==
- Colledge, J. J.; Warlow, Ben (2006) [1969]. Ships of the Royal Navy: The Complete Record of All Fighting Ships of the Royal Navy from the 15th Century to the Present (3rd Rev ed.). London: Chatham Publishing. ISBN 978-1-86176-281-8. OCLC 67375475.
- Winfield, Rif (2008). British Warships in the Age of Sail 1793–1817: Design, Construction, Careers and Fates. Seaforth. ISBN 978-1-86176-246-7.
