= HMS Curieux =

At least two vessels of the Royal Navy have borne the name HMS Curieux, from the French word for "curious":

- HMS Curieux (1804) was an 18-gun brig-sloop, the French Navy's corvette Curieux, launched in 1800, captured by the Royal Navy in 1804, and wrecked in 1809.
- HMS Curieux (1809) was the French Navy's brig Béarnais, launched in 1808, that the Royal Navy captured in 1809, laid up in ordinary in 1810, and sold in 1814.
