= HMS Cheerful =

Four ships of the Royal Navy have borne the name HMS Cheerful, after the adjective describing a happy and optimistic state:

- HMS Cheerful (1806), a 12-gun cutter, launched in 1806 and sold in 1816.
- HMS Cheerful (1856), a wooden Cheerful-class gunboat launched at Deptford in 1856 and broken up in 1869.
- HMS Cheerful (1897) a three funnel, 30-knot destroyer launched in 1897 and sunk in 1917 by a mine off the Shetland Islands.
- HMS Cheerful (J388) an Algerine-class minesweeper, launched in 1944 and broken up in 1963.
