= HMS Clacton =

Two ships of the Royal Navy were named HMS Clacton

- HMS Clacton (1904), an auxiliary minesweeper torpedoed and sunk in 1917
- HMS Clacton (J151), a Bangor-class minesweeper launched in 1941 and sunk in 1943
