= HMS Carlotta =

HMS Carlotta has been the name of two brigs of the British Royal Navy, and may refer to:

- HMS Carlotta, was the French brig Carlotta (1807) launched in 1807 that HMS Belle Poule captured in 1810, and that was wrecked in 1812.
- HMS Carlotta (1812), was the brig Pylades, probably captured in 1812, and renamed Carlotta after the wreck of her predecessor, and broken up in 1815.
