= HMS Confiance =

Ten ships of the Royal Navy have borne the name HMS Confiance:

- HMS Confiance (1797) was a 24-gun sixth rate captured from the French in 1797 and in service until at least 1801.
- HMS Confiance was a 22-gun privateer captured from the French on 4 June 1805, brought into service as a sloop, reclassified in 1807 as a sixth rate, and sold in 1810.
- HMS Confiance was a 38-gun fifth rate, formerly the French frigate Minerve, which the British captured in 1795 and named HMS Minerve. The French retook her in 1806 and renamed her Cannoniere, and then Confiance. When the British recaptured her in 1810, they named her HMS Confiance. She was listed until 1814.
- HMS Confiance was a schooner that the merchants of Jamaica lent to the Royal Navy while Decouverte was undergoing repairs between 1811 and 1812. Under the command of Lieutenant Richard Williams, of Decouverte, Confiance escorted small vessels to Santiago de Cuba and Cartagena, Colombia. She also carried dispatches to Santa Martha and Porto Bello, Panama.
- HMS Confiance was the 2-gun schooner USS Julia that the British captured in 1813 and converted to a troop transport, and that the Americans recaptured on Lake Ontario a few months later.
- HMS Confiance (1813) was a Cruizer-class brig-sloop launched in 1813 and wrecked in 1822 between Moyin Head and the Three Castles Head near Crookhaven, Ireland, with the loss of all her crew.
- HMS Confiance was the 2-gun schooner USS Scorpion, launched 1813 at Presque'ile, captured 6 September 1814, placed in ordinary in 1817, and broken up in 1831.
- HMS Confiance (1814) was a 36-gun fifth rate launched in 1814 on Lake Champlain and captured by the Americans that year during the Battle of Plattsburg in which she lost her commander and 41 of her crew of 270.
- HMS Confiance (1818) was a 32-gun fifth rate built in 1818. Her fate is unknown.
- HMS Confiance (1824) was a 2-gun schooner launched in 1824 and in service until at least 1831.
- HMS Confiance (1827) was to have been a Cherokee-class brig-sloop. She was re-ordered and launched as a wooden paddle vessel in 1827 and was broken up in 1873.
