= HMS Candytuft =

At least three ships of the Royal Navy have been named HMS Candytuft :

- HMS Candytuft (1917) was an Anchusa-class sloop launched in May 1917 and torpedoed and stranded in November 1917.
- HMS Candytuft (K09) was a Flower-class corvette launched in July 1940. She was transferred to the United States Navy in March 1942 as USS Tenacity
- HMS Candytuft (K484) was a Modified Flower-class corvette launched in September 1943, but which served as HMCS Long Branch (K487) with the Royal Canadian Navy from January 1944 to June 1945.
