= HMS Campanula =

Two ships of the Royal Navy have been named HMS Campanula :

- HMS Campanula (1915) an Arabis-class sloop launched in 1915 and sold in 1922
- HMS Campanula (K18), a Flower-class corvette launched in 1940 and scrapped in 1947
