= HMS Cameleon =

Seven ships of the Royal Navy have borne the name HMS Chameleon, or the archaic variants HMS Cameleon or HMS Camelion, after the Chameleon:

- HMS Chameleon (1777) was a 14-gun sloop launched in 1777. She foundered in 1780.
- HMS Chameleon (1780) was a 16-gun brig-sloop, formerly the civilian ship Hawke. She was purchased in 1780 and sold in 1783.
- HMS Cameleon (1795) was an 18-gun brig-sloop launched in 1795, laid up in 1805, and broken up in 1811.
- HMS Cameleon (1816) was a 10-gun Cherokee-class brig-sloop launched in 1816 and sold in 1849.
- HMS Camelion (1860) was a Camelion-class screw sloop launched in 1860 and sold in 1883.
- HMS Cameleon (1910) was an Acorn-class destroyer launched in 1910 and sold for scrapping in 1921.
- HMS Chameleon (J387) was an Algerine-class minesweeper launched in 1944 and broken up in 1966.
