= HMS Cowslip =

Two ships of the Royal Navy have been named HMS Cowslip :

- HMS Cowslip (1917) an Anchusa-class sloop launched in 1917 and sunk in 1918
- HMS Cowslip (K196), a Flower-class corvette launched in 1941 and sold in 1948
