= HMS Celandine =

At least two ships of the Royal Navy have been named HMS Celandine :

- HMS Celandine (1916) was an Arabis-class sloop launched in 1916 and scrapped in 1923.
- HMS Celandine (K75) was a Flower-class corvette launched in 1940 and scrapped in 1948
