= HMS Cotswold =

Two ships of the Royal Navy have borne the name HMS Cotswold:

- HMS Cotswold (1916) was a Hunt-class minesweeper launched in 1916 and sold in 1923 for scrapping.
- HMS Cotswold (L54) was a Hunt-class destroyer launched in 1940 and sold in 1957 for scrapping.
