= HMS Cherwell =

Destroyer of the Royal Navy

History

United Kingdom
- Name: Cherwell
- Ordered: 1902–1903 Naval Estimates
- Builder: Palmers Shipbuilding and Iron Company, Jarrow
- Laid down: 20 January 1903
- Launched: 23 July 1903
- Commissioned: March 1904
- Out of service: In 1919 she was laid up in reserve awaiting disposal
- Fate: 23 June 1919 sold to Thos. W. Ward of Sheffield for breaking at Rainham, Kent on the Thames Estuary

General characteristics
- Class & type: Palmer Type River Class destroyer
- Displacement: 550 long tons (559 t) standard; 620 long tons (630 t) full load; 223 ft 6 in (68.12 m) o/a; 23 ft 6 in (7.16 m) Beam; 7 ft 4.5 in (2.248 m) Draught
- Propulsion: 4 × Reed water tube boilers; 2 × Vertical Triple Expansion (VTE) steam engines driving 2 shafts producing 7,000 shp (5,200 kW) (average)
- Speed: 25.5 kn (47.2 km/h)
- Range: 140 tons coal; 1,620 nmi (3,000 km) at 11 kn (20 km/h)
- Complement: 70 officers and men
- Armament: 1 × QF 12-pounder 12 cwt Mark I, mounting P Mark I; 3 × QF 12-pounder 8 cwt, mounting G Mark I (Added in 1906); 5 × QF 6-pounder 8 cwt (removed in 1906); 2 × single tubes for 18-inch (450mm) torpedoes

Service record
- Part of: East Coast Destroyer Flotilla (1905); 3rd Destroyer Flotilla (April 1909); 5th Destroyer Flotilla (1912); Assigned E Class (August 1912 – October 1913); 9th Destroyer Flotilla (1914); 1st Destroyer Flotilla (November 1916)
- Operations: World War I

HMS Cherwell was a Palmer Type River-class destroyer ordered by the Royal Navy under the 1902 – 1903 Naval Estimates. Named after the River Cherwell in south central England near Oxford, she was the first ship to carry this name in the Royal Navy.

== Construction ==
She was laid down on 20 January 1903 at the Palmers shipyard at Jarrow and launched on 23 July 1903. She was completed in March 1904. Her original armament was to be the same as the Turleback torpedo boat destroyers that preceded her. In 1906 the Admiralty decided to upgrade the armament by landing the five 6-pounder naval guns and shipping three 12-pounder 8 hundredweight (cwt) guns. Two would be mounted abeam at the fo'c's'le break and the third gun would be mounted on the quarterdeck.

== Pre-War ==
After commissioning she was assigned to the East Coast Destroyer Flotilla of the 1st Fleet and based at Harwich.

On 27 April 1908 the Eastern Flotilla departed Harwich for live fire and night manoeuvres. During these exercises HMS Attentive rammed and sank HMS Gala, then damaged HMS Ribble.

In April 1909 she was assigned to the 3rd Destroyer Flotilla on its formation at Harwich. She remained until displaced by a Basilisk class destroyer by May 1912. She was assigned to the 5th Destroyer Flotilla of the 2nd Fleet with a nucleus crew.

On 30 August 1912 the Admiralty directed all destroyer classes were to be designated by alpha characters starting with the letter 'A'. The ships of the River class were assigned to the E class. After 30 September 1913, she was known as an E class destroyer and had the letter 'E' painted on the hull below the bridge area and on either the fore or aft funnel.

== World War I ==
In early 1914 when displaced by G class destroyers she joined the 9th Destroyer Flotilla based at Chatham tendered to HMS St George. The 9th Flotilla was a Patrol Flotilla tasked with anti-submarine and counter mining patrols in the Firth of Forth area. Soon after the commencement of hostilities she was deployed to the Scapa Flow Local Flotilla under the command of the Commander-in-Chief Home Fleet tendered to HMS St Vincent. Her duties here included counter mining patrols and antisubmarine measures in defence of the Fleet anchorage.

In August 1915 with the amalgamation of the 7th and 9th Flotillas, she had been redeployed to the North Channel Patrol based at Larne, Northern Ireland. Here she was employed in escorting merchant ships, anti-submarine patrols and counter smuggling patrols.

In November 1916, she was assigned to the 1st Destroyer Flotilla when it was redeployed to Portsmouth. She was equipped with depth charges for employment in anti-submarine patrols, escorting of merchant ships and defending the Dover Barrage. In the spring of 1917 as the convoy system was being introduced the 1st Flotilla was employed in convoy escort duties for the English Channel for the remainder of the war.

== Disposition ==
In 1919 she was paid off and laid up in reserve awaiting disposal. On 23 June 1919 she was sold to Thos. W. Ward of Sheffield for breaking at Rainham, Kent on the Thames Estuary.

She was not awarded a Battle Honour for her service.

== Pennant Numbers ==
Pennant Number	From	To
N90	6 December 1914	1 September 1915
D13	1 September 1915	1 January 1918
D17	1 January 1918	23 June 1919

== Bibliography ==
- Chesneau, Roger & Kolesnik, Eugene M., eds. (1979). Conway's All The World's Fighting Ships 1860–1905. London: Conway Maritime Press. ISBN 0-85177-133-5.
- Colledge, J. J.; Warlow, Ben (2006) [1969]. Ships of the Royal Navy: The Complete Record of All Fighting Ships of the Royal Navy from the 15th Century to the Present (3rd Rev ed.). London: Chatham Publishing. ISBN 978-1-86176-281-8. OCLC 67375475.
- Dittmar, F.J.; Colledge, J. J. (1972). British Warships 1914–1919. Shepperton, UK: Ian Allan. ISBN 0-7110-0380-7.
- Friedman, Norman (2009). British Destroyers: From Earliest Days to the Second World War. Barnsley, UK: Seaforth Publishing. ISBN 978-1-84832-049-9.
- Gardiner, Robert & Gray, Randal, eds. (1985). Conway's All The World's Fighting Ships 1906–1921. London: Conway Maritime Press. ISBN 0-85177-245-5.
- Manning, T. D. (1961). The British Destroyer. London: Putnam & Co. OCLC 6470051.
- March, Edgar J. (1966). British Destroyers: A History of Development, 1892–1953; Drawn by Admiralty Permission From Official Records & Returns, Ships' Covers & Building Plans. London: Seeley Service. OCLC 164893555.
