= HMS Cheerly =

Favourite-class tugboat of the Royal Navy

History

United Kingdom
- Builder: Levingston Shipbuilding Company, Orange, Texas
- Launched: 23 July 1943
- Commissioned: 18 January 1944
- Stricken: 12 April 1946
- Fate: Returned to US Navy, 19 February 1946 and sold for merchant service 1948

General characteristics
- Displacement: 852 tons light
- Length: 165 ft 6 in (50.44 m)
- Beam: 33 ft 4 in (10.16 m)
- Draught: 15 ft 6 in (4.72 m)
- Propulsion: one Prescott Co. vertical triple-expansion reciprocating steam engine two Foster Wheeler "D"-type boilers, 200psi, Sat two Turbo drive Ships Service Generators, 60 kW 120 V D.C. single propeller, 1,600 hp
- Speed: 12.2 knots (22.6 km/h; 14.0 mph)
- Complement: 52
- Armament: 1 x 3"/50 caliber gun * 2 x single 20mm AA guns

HMS Cheerly (W 153) was a Favourite-class tugboat of the Royal Navy during World War II.

== Service history ==
Cheerly was laid down in early 1943 at the Levingston Shipbuilding Company in Orange, Texas, as ATR-95, launched 23 July 1943 and commissioned into the Royal Navy as Cheerly under Lend-Lease on 18 January 1944. Cheerly served as a rescue tug with convoys in the English Channel and also Gibraltar convoy ON273. She was returned to the United States Navy on 19 February 1946, struck on 12 April 1946 and sold for merchant service in 1948.
