= HMS Carysfort =

Five ships of the Royal Navy have borne the name HMS Carysfort:

- HMS Carysfort (1766) was a 28-gun sixth rate launched in 1766 and sold in 1813
- HMS Carysfort (1836) was a 26-gun sixth rate launched in 1836 and sold in 1861
- HMS Carysfort (1878) was a Comus-class screw corvette launched in 1878 and sold in 1899
- HMS Carysfort (1914) was a C-class light cruiser launched in 1914 and scrapped in 1931
- HMS Carysfort (R25) was a C-class destroyer launched in 1944 and sold in 1970
