= HMS Cruizer =

Eleven ships of the Royal Navy have borne the name HMS Cruizer or HMS Cruiser:

- HMS Cruizer (1705) was a 24-gun sixth rate, previously the French ship De Meric. She was captured in 1705 by HMS Tryton and was wrecked in 1708.
- HMS Cruizer (1709) was a 14-gun sloop. She was previously named Unity, before being purchased in 1709. She was sold in 1712.
- HMS Cruizer (1721) was an 8-gun sloop captured in 1721 and foundered in 1724.
- HMS Cruizer (1721 sloop) was an 8-gun sloop launched in 1721 and broken up in 1731.
- HMS Cruizer (1732) was a 14-gun sloop launched in 1732 and broken up in 1744.
- HMS Cruizer (1752) was an 8-gun Cruizer-class sloop launched in 1752 and burnt in 1776.
- HMS Cruizer (1780) was a 14-gun cutter purchased in 1780 and lost in 1792.
- HMS Cruizer (1797) was the prototype of the 18-gun Cruizer-class brig sloops, to which design 110 vessels were ordered; the prototype was launched in 1797 and sold in 1819.
- HMS Cruizer (1828) was a Snake-class ship sloop launched in 1828, converted to a brig in 1831, back to a ship in 1840 and sold at Bombay in 1849.
- HMS Cruizer (1852) was a Cruizer-class wooden screw sloop launched in 1852. She was renamed HMS Cruiser in 1857, and then converted into a training ship and renamed HMS Lark in 1893. She was sold in 1912.
- HMS Cruizer was a Doterel-class sloop, previously named HMS Kingfisher. She had been launched in 1879, renamed HMS Lark in 1892 and HMS Cruizer in 1893. She was sold in 1919.
