= HMS Cracker =

Five vessels named HMS Cracker have served the Royal Navy. A sixth was ordered but the order was cancelled.

- HMS Cracker (1797) was an Acute-class gun-brig, launched in 1797. She was sold in 1802.
- HMS Cracker (1804) was a later Archer-class gun brig, launched in 1804. She participated in several actions and captured two small French privateers. She was sold for breaking up in 1816.
- HMS Cracker (1826) was a cutter purchased at Cowes and sold in November 1842.
- Cracker was a schooner ordered in 1846 from the Deptford Dockyard. The order was cancelled on 1850.
- HMS Cracker (1855) was a wood, screw Dapper-class gunboat launched by Pitcher, Northfleet. She was sold for breaking up in April 1864.
- HMS Cracker (1867) was a composite screw gunboat launched at Portsmouth. She was broken up there in 1889.
