= List of ship launches in 1907 =

The list of ship launches in 1907 includes a chronological list of some ships launched in 1907.

Date	Ship	Class / type	Builder	Location	Country	Notes
12 January	Coutelas	Claymore-class destroyer	Arsenal de Rochefort	Rochefort	France	Struck 1921.
14 January	Bonetta	Torpedo boat destroyer	Palmers Shipbuilding and Iron Company	Jarrow	United Kingdom	Scrapped 1920.
24 January	G137	S90-class torpedo boat	Germaniawerft	Kiel	Germany	For Imperial German Navy
31 January	Fulani	Cargo ship	Harland & Wolff	Belfast	United Kingdom	For Elder Dempster..
15 February	C7	C-class submarine	Vickers	Barrow-in-Furness	United Kingdom	Sold for scrapping, 1919
15 February	C8	C-class submarine	Vickers	Barrow-in-Furness	United Kingdom	Sold for scrapping, 1920
16 February	Cossack	Tribal-class destroyer	Cammell Laird	Birkenhead, England	United Kingdom	Scrapped 1919
28 February	Ludworth	Cargo ship	Blyth Shipbuilding & Dry Docks Co. Ltd	Blyth	United Kingdom	For Furness Withy & Co. Ltd.
2 March	Avon	Passenger ship	Harland & Wolff	Belfast	United Kingdom	For Royal Mail Lines.
4 March	B.H.C. Rockbreaker No. 2	Dredger	Blyth Shipbuilding & Dry Docks Co. Ltd	Blyth	United Kingdom	For Blyth Harbour Commissioners.
7 March	Stettin	Königsberg-class cruiser	AG Vulcan Stettin	Stettin	Germany	
15 March	C10	C-class submarine	Vickers	Barrow-in-Furness	United Kingdom	Sold for scrapping, 1922
16 March	Indomitable	Invincible-class battlecruiser	Fairfield Shipbuilding and Engineering Company	Govan	United Kingdom	Scrapped 1921
27 March	C11	C-class submarine	Vickers	Barrow-in-Furness	United Kingdom	Sunk in collision, 1909
29 March	Prashu	Cargo ship	Harland & Wolff	Belfast	United Kingdom	For Elder Dempster.
30 March	Viper	B-class submarine	Fore River Shipyard	Quincy, Massachusetts	United States	Sunk as a target, 1922
30 March	Tarantula	B-class submarine	Fore River Shipyard	Quincy, Massachusetts	United States	Sunk as a target, 1922
3 April	C9	C-class submarine	Vickers	Barrow-in-Furness	United Kingdom	Sold for scrapping, 1922
6 April	S143	S138-class torpedo boat	Schichau-Werke	Elbing	Germany	For Imperial German Navy
13 April	Invincible	Invincible-class battlecruiser	Armstrong Whitworth	Elswick	United Kingdom	Sunk 31 May 1916
14 April	Aki	Satsuma-class battleship	Kure Naval Arsenal	Kure, Hiroshima	Japan	Sunk as target, 1924
21 April	Roma	Regina Elena-class battleship	La Spezia Naval Base	La Spezia	Italy	
24 April	Defence	Minotaur-class cruiser	Pembroke Dockyard	Pembroke Dock	United Kingdom	Sunk 31 May 1916
26 April	Atalanta	Passenger vessel	Gourlay Brothers	Dundee	United Kingdom	Sold in 1923
30 April	Thornley	Cargo ship	Blyth Shipbuilding & Dry Docks Co. Ltd	Blyth	United Kingdom	For British Maritime Trust Ltd.
May	Irene	Ketch	FJ Carver and Son	Bridgwater, England	United Kingdom	100-foot ketch built in Bridgwater in 1907, the last ship built in the docks and the only ketch built in the West Country still sailing.
8 May	Afridi	Tribal-class destroyer	Armstrong Whitworth	Elswick, England	United Kingdom	Scrapped 1919
28 May	Vérité	Liberté-class battleship	Forges et Chantiers de la Gironde	Lormont	France	
29 May	Birmingham	Chester-class cruiser	Fore River Shipyard	Quincy, Massachusetts	United States	Sold for scrap, 1930
30 May	Alexandra	Royal yacht	A. & J. Inglis	Glasgow, Scotland	United Kingdom	Sold to Norway in 1925, sunk by German bombers in 1940
26 June	Inflexible	Invincible-class battlecruiser	John Brown & Company	Clydebank	United Kingdom	Scrapped 1922
26 June	Chester	Chester-class cruiser	Bath Iron Works	Bath, Maine	United States	Scrapped 1930
27 June	Rubis	Émeraude-class submarine	Arsenal de Cherbourg	Cherbourg	France	For French Navy
27 June	Pluviôse	Pluviôse-class submarine	Arsenal de Cherbourg	Cherbourg	France	For French Navy
27 June	Iroquois	Tanker	Harland & Wolff	Belfast	United Kingdom	For Anglo-American Oil Company.
29 June	Carquois	Claymore-class destroyer	Arsenal de Rochefort	Rochefort	France	Struck 1930.
29 June	Sibyl Marston	schooner	W. A. Boole & Son	Oakland, California	United States	
9 July	California	Passenger liner	D & W Henderson Ltd	Glasgow	United Kingdom	For Anchor Line
10 July	Blackwood	Cargo ship	Blyth Shipbuilding & Dry Docks Co. Ltd	Blyth	United Kingdom	For Tyneside Line Ltd.
10 July	Lonchi	Thyella-class destroyer	Yarrow Shipbuilders	London	United Kingdom	
10 July	TB 13	Cricket-class coastal destroyer	J. Samuel White	Cowes	United Kingdom	
27 July	Bellerophon	Bellerophon-class battleship	Portsmouth Dockyard	Portsmouth, England	United Kingdom	Scrapped 1921
15 August	Bayan	Bayan-class cruiser	Admiralty Shipyard	Saint Petersburg	Russia	Scrapped 1922
23 August	Ventôse	Pluviôse-class submarine	Arsenal de Cherbourg	Cherbourg	France	For French Navy
24 August	Temeraire	Bellerophon-class battleship	HM Dockyard	Devonport	United Kingdom	Sold for scrap 1921
4 September	Akula	Submarine	Baltic Shipyard	Saint Petersburg	Russia	Sunk 1915
7 September	Imperator Pavel I	Andrei Pervozvanny-class battleship	Baltic Shipyard	Saint Petersburg	Russia	Scrapped 1923
9 September	Tarmo	Icebreaker	Sir W.G. Armstrong, Whitworth & Co Ltd	Newcastle upon Tyne	United Kingdom	Museum ship in Kotka, Finland
9 September	C12	C-class submarine	Vickers	Barrow-in-Furness	United Kingdom	Sold for scrapping, 1920
10 September	Elterwater	Steamship	Blyth Shipbuilding & Dry Docks Co. Ltd	Blyth	United Kingdom	For Elterwater Steamship Co. Ltd.
19 September	Circé	Circé-class submarine	Arsenal de Toulon	Toulon	France	Sunk by U-boat, 1918
21 September	Edgar Quinet	Edgar Quinet-class cruiser	Brest Dockyard	Brest	France	
22 September	Principessa Jolanda	Ocean liner	Cantiere Navale di Riva Trigoso	Riva Trigoso	Italy	Capsized on launch
26 September	Asturias	Passenger ship	Harland & Wolff	Belfast	United Kingdom	For Royal Mail Lines.
5 October	Dresden	Dresden-class cruiser	Blohm & Voss	Hamburg	Germany	Sunk on 14 March 1915 at Mas a Tierra
8 October	Branlebas	Branlebas-class destroyer	Chantiers et Ateliers Augustin Normand	Le Havre	France	Sunk on 30 September 1915.
10 October	Navahoe	Schooner oil barge	Harland & Wolff	Belfast	United Kingdom	For Anglo-American Oil Company.
21 October	Kurama	Ibuki-class armored cruiser	Yokosuka Naval Arsenal	Yokosuka	Japan	
22 October	Calypso	Circé-class submarine	Arsenal de Toulon	Toulon	France	Sunk in collision, 1914
22 October	Copenhagen	Passenger vessel	John Brown & Company	Clydebank	United Kingdom	Sunk, 1917
23 October	Albatross	Nautilus-class minelayer	AG Weser	Bremen	Germany	Broken up, 1921
7 November	Superb	Bellerophon-class battleship	Armstrong Whitworth	Elswick, England	United Kingdom	Sold for scrap 1922
9 November	C13	C-class submarine	Vickers	Barrow-in-Furness	United Kingdom	Sold for scrapping, 1920
16 November	Santa Elena	Merchant ship	Blohm & Voss		Germany	Converted as a seaplane carrier in World War I
18 November	Yodo	Yodo-class cruiser	Kawasaki	Kobe	Japan	
21 November	Ibuki	Ibuki-class armored cruiser	Kure Naval Arsenal	Kure, Hiroshima	Japan	
26 November	Cognée	Claymore-class destroyer	Arsenal de Toulon	Toulon	France	Struck 1921.
5 December	Median	Cargo ship	Harland & Wolff	Belfast	United Kingdom	For F. Leyland & Co..
5 December	Redwood	Cargo ship	Blyth Shipbuilding & Dry Docks Co. Ltd	Blyth	United Kingdom	For Tyneside Line Ltd.
7 December	Germinal	Pluviôse-class submarine	Arsenal de Cherbourg	Cherbourg	France	For French Navy
7 December	C14	C-class submarine	Vickers	Barrow-in-Furness	United Kingdom	Sold for scrapping, 1921
14 December	Fleuret	Claymore-class destroyer	Arsenal de Rochefort	Rochefort	France	Struck 1920.
19 December	Fanfare	Branlebas-class destroyer	Chantiers et Ateliers Augustin Normand	Le Havre	France	Struck 1925.
21 December	Gabion	Branlebas-class destroyer	Ateliers et Chantiers de Penhoët	Rouen	France	Struck 1921.
21 December	Pericles	Passenger ship	Harland & Wolff	Belfast	United Kingdom	For Aberdeen Line.
Unknown date	Boy Arthur	Steam drifter	Beeching Brothers Ltd.	Great Yarmouth	United Kingdom	For Richard Sutton.
Unknown date	City of Paris	Ocean liner	Barclay, Curle & Co. Ltd.	Glasgow	United Kingdom	For Ellerman Lines.
Unknown date	Corsican	Ocean liner	Barclay, Curle & Co. Ltd.	Glasgow	United Kingdom	For Allan Line.
Unknown date	Felicia	Steam drifter	Beeching Brothers Ltd.	Great Yarmouth	United Kingdom	For Edward Baker.
Unknown date	Hope	Steam drifter	Beeching Brothers Ltd.	Great Yarmouth	United Kingdom	For Edwarde Catchpole.
Unknown date	Inter Nos	Steam drifter	Beeching Brothers Ltd.	Great Yarmouth	United Kingdom	For Edward Baker.
Unknown date	Kia Ora	Cargo ship	Workman, Clark & Co. Ltd.	Belfast	United Kingdom	For private owner.
Unknown date	Merle	Sloop	Brown & Clapson	Barton-upon-Humber	United Kingdom	For Summerfield & Mead Ltd.
Unknown date	Radiant	Steam drifter	Beeching Brothers Ltd.	Great Yarmouth	United Kingdom	For Daniel Ralph.
Unknown date	Rose	Steam drifter	Beeching Brothers Ltd.	Great Yarmouth	United Kingdom	For Alexander Storm.
Unknown date	Ryhope	Cargo ship	Blyth Shipbuilding & Dry Docks Co. Ltd	Blyth	United Kingdom	For Furness Withy & Co. Ltd.
Unknown date	Selina	Steam drifter	Beeching Brothers Ltd.	Great Yarmouth	United Kingdom	For Frederick Salmon.
Unknown date	Sphinx	Steam drifter	Beeching Brothers Ltd.	Great Yarmouth	United Kingdom	For Horatio Fenner Ltd.
Unknown date	Triumph	Steam drifter	Beeching Brothers Ltd.	Great Yarmouth	United Kingdom	For J. S. Johnson & Sons Ltd.
Unknown date	United	Lighter	Brown & Clapson	Barton-upon-Humber	United Kingdom	For William Carmichael and G. C. Dunwell.
Unknown date	Vigo	Lighter	Brown & Clapson	Barton-upon-Humber	United Kingdom	For Richard Carmichael.
Unknown date	Wasa	Merchant ship	Eriksbergs Mekaniska Verkstad	Gothenburg	Sweden	Sold to Norway in 1925
Unknown date	Unnamed	Lighter	Brown & Clapson	Barton-upon-Humber	United Kingdom	For W. Sleight.
