= C23 =

C23 or C-23 may refer to:

== Vehicles ==
Aircraft

- Beechcraft C23 Musketeer, an American civil utility aircraft
- Caspar C 23, a German sport aircraft
- Caudron C.23, a French bomber biplane
- Lockheed C-23 Altair, an American military transport
- Short C-23 Sherpa, an American military transport

Automobiles

- Sauber C23, a Swiss Formula One car

Ships and boats

- HMS C23, a C-class submarine of the Royal Navy
- Maltese patrol boat C23, involved in the C23 tragedy

== Other uses ==
- C23 (C standard revision), a revision of the C programming language
- C-23 (card game), a collectible card game by Wizards of the Coast
- C23 road (Namibia)
- Bishop's Opening, a chess opening
- Caldwell 23, a spiral galaxy
- Gallbladder cancer

== See also ==
- List of compounds with carbon number 23
