= C28 =

C28 or C-28 may refer to:

== Vehicles ==
- Cessna C-28, an American military transport aircraft
- HMS C28, a C-class submarine of the Royal Navy
- Sikorsky C-28, an amphibious aircraft bought by the United States Army Air Corps

== Other uses ==
- C28 road (Namibia)
- Caldwell 28, an open cluster
- Fighting Internet and Wireless Spam Act, an Act of the Parliament of Canada introduced as Bill C-28
- C28 Music, an experimental electronic music artist
