= HMS C16 =

C-class submarine built for the Royal Navy

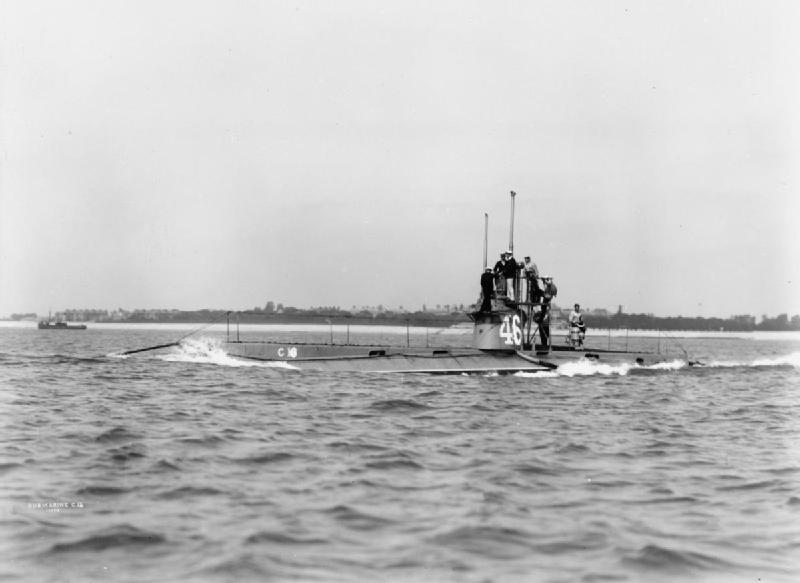
- HMS C16

History

United Kingdom
- Name: HMS C16
- Builder: Vickers, Barrow
- Laid down: 14 December 1906
- Launched: 19 March 1908
- Commissioned: 5 June 1908
- Fate: Sold, 12 August 1922

General characteristics
- Class & type: C-class submarine
- Displacement: 287 long tons (292 t) surfaced; 316 long tons (321 t) submerged
- Length: 142 ft 3 in (43.4 m)
- Beam: 13 ft 7 in (4.1 m)
- Draught: 11 ft 6 in (3.5 m)
- Installed power: 600 bhp (450 kW) petrol; 300 hp (220 kW) electric
- Propulsion: 1 × 16-cylinder Vickers petrol engine; 1 × electric motor
- Speed: 12 kn (22 km/h; 14 mph) surfaced; 7 kn (13 km/h; 8.1 mph) submerged
- Range: 910 nmi (1,690 km; 1,050 mi) at 12 kn (22 km/h; 14 mph) on the surface
- Test depth: 100 feet (30.5 m)
- Complement: 2 officers and 14 ratings
- Armament: 2 × 18 in (450 mm) bow torpedo tubes

HMS C16 was one of 38 C-class submarines built for the Royal Navy in the first decade of the 20th century. The boat survived the First World War and was sold for scrap in 1922.

== Design and description ==
The C class was essentially a repeat of the preceding B class, albeit with better performance underwater. The submarine had a length of 142 feet 3 inches (43.4 m) overall, a beam of 13 feet 7 inches (4.1 m) and a mean draught of 11 feet 6 inches (3.5 m). They displaced 287 long tons (292 t) on the surface and 316 long tons (321 t) submerged. The C-class submarines had a crew of two officers and fourteen ratings.

For surface running, the boats were powered by a single 16-cylinder 600-brake-horsepower (447 kW) Vickers petrol engine that drove one propeller shaft. When submerged the propeller was driven by a 300-horsepower (224 kW) electric motor. They could reach 12 knots (22 km/h; 14 mph) on the surface and 7 knots (13 km/h; 8.1 mph) underwater. On the surface, the C class had a range of 910 nautical miles (1,690 km; 1,050 mi) at 12 knots (22 km/h; 14 mph).

The boats were armed with two 18-inch (45 cm) torpedo tubes in the bow. They could carry a pair of reload torpedoes, but generally did not as they would have to remove an equal weight of fuel in compensation.

== Construction and career ==
C16 was built by Vickers at their Barrow-in-Furness shipyard, laid down on 14 December 1906 and was commissioned on 5 June 1908. The boat collided with C17 east of Cromer, Norfolk on 14 July 1909 when the steamer Eddystone drove through the flotilla - colliding with and sinking HMS C11. C16 was undamaged and participated in the Lord Mayor's Pageant (17-24 July 1909). C16 was sunk after being rammed at periscope depth by destroyer Melampus off Harwich on 16 April 1917. The boat bottomed out at 60 ft (18 m). A Mate – Samuel Anderson – was fired through a torpedo tube to try to escape, but unfortunately drowned. The captain – Lieutenant Harold Boase – tried to flood the boat in an effort to escape through the fore hatch, but the fender jammed the hatch, so the crew was trapped. The escape attempts were recorded by the commanding officer, and were found corked in a bottle found lying near him when the hull was salvaged. All the crew of C16 died. C16 was salvaged and recommissioned. C16 was finally sold on 12 August 1922.
