= C14 =

C14, C.XIV or C-14 may refer to:

== Science and technology ==
- IEC 60320 C14, a polarised, three pole socket electrical connector
- Malignant neoplasm of other and ill-defined sites in the lip, oral cavity and pharynx (ICD-10 code), a head and neck cancer
- Caldwell 14, in the constellation Perseus
- Carbon-14 (^{14}C), a radioactive isotope of carbon
  - C-14 dating, a method for dating events

== Transportation ==
- Autovía C-14, a highway in Catalonia, Spain
- Fokker C.XIV, a 1937 Dutch reconnaissance seaplane
- HMS C14, a 1908 British C-class submarine
- LSWR C14 class, a London and South Western Railway locomotive class
- LNER Class C14, a class of British steam locomotives
- Ramal C-14, the Argentinian track of the Salta–Antofagasta railway
- Sauber C14, a 1995 racing car
- C 14-class missile boat, a light missile boat of catamaran design
- Boeing YC-14, an American experimental transport aircraft of the 1970s
- Kawasaki 1400GTR or Concours 14, a 1,352cc motorcycle

== Other uses ==
- 14th century
- C14 Timberwolf, a Canadian .338 Lapua sniper rifle
- C14 (Ukrainian group), a radical nationalist group in Ukraine
- French Defence (Encyclopedia of Chess Openings code)
- Bill C-14, a bill legalizing euthanasia in Canada
- Channel 14 (Israel), an Israeli television channel abbreviated as C14
