= HMS C29 =

Submarine of the Royal Navy

History

United Kingdom
- Name: HMS C29
- Builder: Vickers, Barrow
- Laid down: 4 June 1908
- Launched: 19 June 1909
- Commissioned: 17 September 1909
- Fate: Sunk by mine, 29 August 1915

General characteristics
- Class & type: C-class submarine
- Displacement: 290 long tons (290 t) surfaced; 320 long tons (330 t) submerged
- Length: 142 ft 3 in (43.4 m)
- Beam: 13 ft 7 in (4.1 m)
- Draught: 11 ft 6 in (3.5 m)
- Installed power: 600 bhp (450 kW) petrol; 300 hp (220 kW) electric
- Propulsion: 1 × 16-cylinder Vickers petrol engine; 1 × electric motor
- Speed: 13 kn (24 km/h; 15 mph) surfaced; 8 kn (15 km/h; 9.2 mph) submerged
- Range: 910 nmi (1,690 km; 1,050 mi) at 12 kn (22 km/h; 14 mph) on the surface
- Test depth: 100 feet (30.5 m)
- Complement: 2 officers and 14 ratings
- Armament: 2 × 18 in (450 mm) bow torpedo tubes

HMS C29 was one of 38 C-class submarines built for the Royal Navy in the first decade of the 20th century. C29 served in the First World War until she was sunk by mine on 29 August 1915.

== Design and description ==
The C-class boats of the 1907–08 and subsequent Naval Programmes were modified to improve their speed, both above and below the surface. The submarine had a length of 142 feet 3 inches (43.4 m) overall, a beam of 13 feet 7 inches (4.1 m) and a mean draught of 11 feet 6 inches (3.5 m). They displaced 290 long tons (290 t) on the surface and 320 long tons (330 t) submerged. The C-class submarines had a crew of two officers and fourteen ratings.

For surface running, the boats were powered by a single 12-cylinder 600-brake-horsepower (447 kW) Vickers petrol engine that drove one propeller shaft. When submerged the propeller was driven by a 300-horsepower (224 kW) electric motor. They could reach 13 knots (24 km/h; 15 mph) on the surface and 8 knots (15 km/h; 9.2 mph) underwater. On the surface, the C class had a range of 910 nautical miles (1,690 km; 1,050 mi) at 12 knots (22 km/h; 14 mph).

The boats were armed with two 18-inch (45 cm) torpedo tubes in the bow. They could carry a pair of reload torpedoes, but generally did not as they would have to remove an equal weight of fuel in compensation.

== Construction and career ==
HMS C29 was built by Vickers, Barrow. She was laid down on 4 June 1908 and was commissioned on 17 September 1909. The boat sank a merchant ship while patrolling the Gulf of Riga in the Baltic.

C29 was involved in the use of the U-boat trap tactic. The tactic was to use a decoy trawler to tow a submarine. When a U-boat was sighted, the tow line and communication line was slipped and the submarine would attack the U-boat. The tactic was partly successful, but was abandoned after the loss of two C-class submarines. In both cases, all the crew were lost. C29 was one of the two C-class submarines sunk while attempting to employ the tactic; she was mined when her trawler Ariadne strayed into a minefield in the Humber Estuary on 29 August 1915.
