= British C-class submarine =

1905 class of British submarines

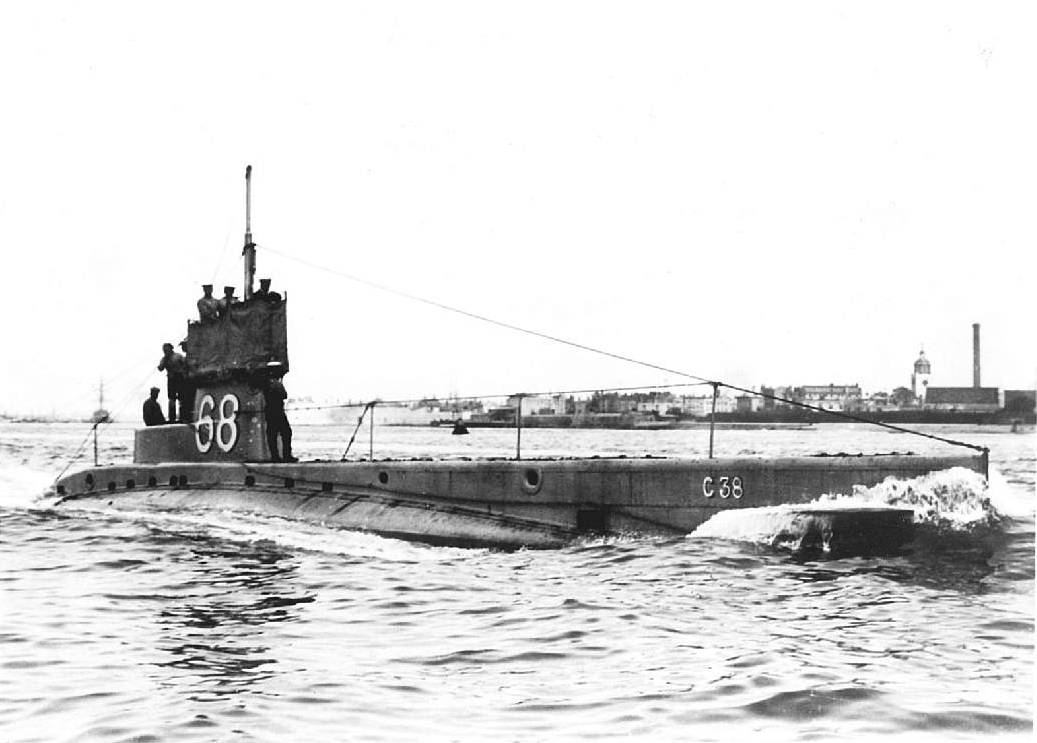
- HMS C38

Class overview
- Name: C-class
- Builders: Vickers, Barrow; HM Dockyard Chatham
- Operators: Royal Navy
- Preceded by: B class
- Succeeded by: D class
- Subclasses: Group 1 : C-1 — C-18; Group 2 : C-19 — C-38
- In commission: 30 October 1906–1922
- Completed: 38
- Lost: 10
- Retired: 28

General characteristics
- Type: Submarine
- Displacement: Group 1 : 287 long tons (292 t) surfaced; 316 long tons (321 t) submerged; Group 2 : 290 long tons (295 t) surfaced; 320 long tons (325 t) submerged
- Length: 143 ft 2 in (43.64 m)
- Beam: 13 ft 6 in (4.11 m)
- Propulsion: 600 hp (450 kW) Vickers petrol engine, 200 hp electric motor, single propeller
- Speed: Group 1 : 12 kn (22 km/h; 14 mph) surfaced; 7 kn (13 km/h; 8.1 mph) submerged; Group 2 : 13 kn (24 km/h; 15 mph) surfaced; 8 kn (15 km/h; 9.2 mph) submerged
- Range: Group 1 : 1,500 nmi (2,800 km) at 7 kn (13 km/h; 8.1 mph) surfaced; 50 nmi (93 km) at 4.5 kn (8.3 km/h; 5.2 mph) submerged; Group 2: 2,000 nmi (3,700 km) at 7 kn (13 km/h; 8.1 mph) surfaced; 55 nmi (102 km) at 5 kn (9.3 km/h; 5.8 mph) submerged
- Complement: 16
- Armament: 2 × 18-inch (450 mm) torpedo tubes (2 torpedoes)

The British C-class submarines were the last class of petrol engined submarines of the Royal Navy and marked the end of the development of the Holland class in the Royal Navy. Thirty-eight were constructed between 1905 and 1910 and they served through World War I.

With limited endurance and only a ten per cent reserve of buoyancy over their surface displacement, they were poor surface vessels, but their spindle shaped hull made for good underwater performance compared to their contemporaries.

== Service history ==
Three (C36, C37 and C38) had been sent to Hong Kong in 1911 and during the war the remainder were mainly used for coastal defence, based at the east coast ports of Leith, Harwich, Hartlepool, Grimsby and Dover, some operating with Q-ships which were decoying U-boats. The technique was for a trawler to tow the submarine and communicate with it by telephone. When a U-boat surfaced to attack the trawler with its deck gun, the British submarine would slip its tow and attempt to torpedo the U-boat.

C3, the first boat commissioned, was employed during the Zeebrugge raid on 23 April 1918. Packed with explosives it was blown up in an attempt to destroy a viaduct, for which her commander Lieutenant Richard Sandford was awarded the Victoria Cross.

Four operated in the Baltic Sea, based at Tallinn as part of the blockade of Germany trying to prevent the import of iron ore from Sweden. They were sent there in September 1915 via a tortuous route — towed around the North Cape to Arkhangelsk and taken by barge to Kronstadt. Three of these boats were destroyed (along with the British E-class submarines E1, E8, E9, E19) outside Helsinki in 1918 to prevent capture by German troops of the Baltic Sea Division who had landed nearby.

HMS C15 torpedoed and sank the German submarine UC-65 in 1917. C24 sank U-40 on 23 June 1915 in the first successful use of the Q ship trap tactic. C27 sank U-23 eight days later using the same trap tactic.

Ten of the submarines were lost during the war, including C16 which was mistakenly rammed by HMS Melampus. The surviving boats were disposed of at the end of the war with the exception of C4, which was retained for trials until being scrapped in 1922.

The Imperial Japanese Navy also used their own version of the C class, which they had bought from Vickers, this was the Ha-1-class submarine, two almost-identical designs came from Ha-1, these were the Ha-3 and Ha-7 classes.

== C-class boats ==
38 C-class boats were built in total for the RN:

- HMS C1
- HMS C2
- HMS C3
- HMS C4
- HMS C5
- HMS C6
- HMS C7
- HMS C8
- HMS C9
- HMS C10
- HMS C11
- HMS C12
- HMS C13
- HMS C14
- HMS C15
- HMS C16
- HMS C17
- HMS C18
- HMS C19
- HMS C20
- HMS C21
- HMS C22
- HMS C23
- HMS C24
- HMS C25
- HMS C26
- HMS C27
- HMS C28
- HMS C29
- HMS C30
- HMS C31
- HMS C32
- HMS C33
- HMS C34
- HMS C35
- HMS C36
- HMS C37
- HMS C38

== See also ==
- CC-class submarine
