= HMS C2 =

Submarine of the Royal Navy

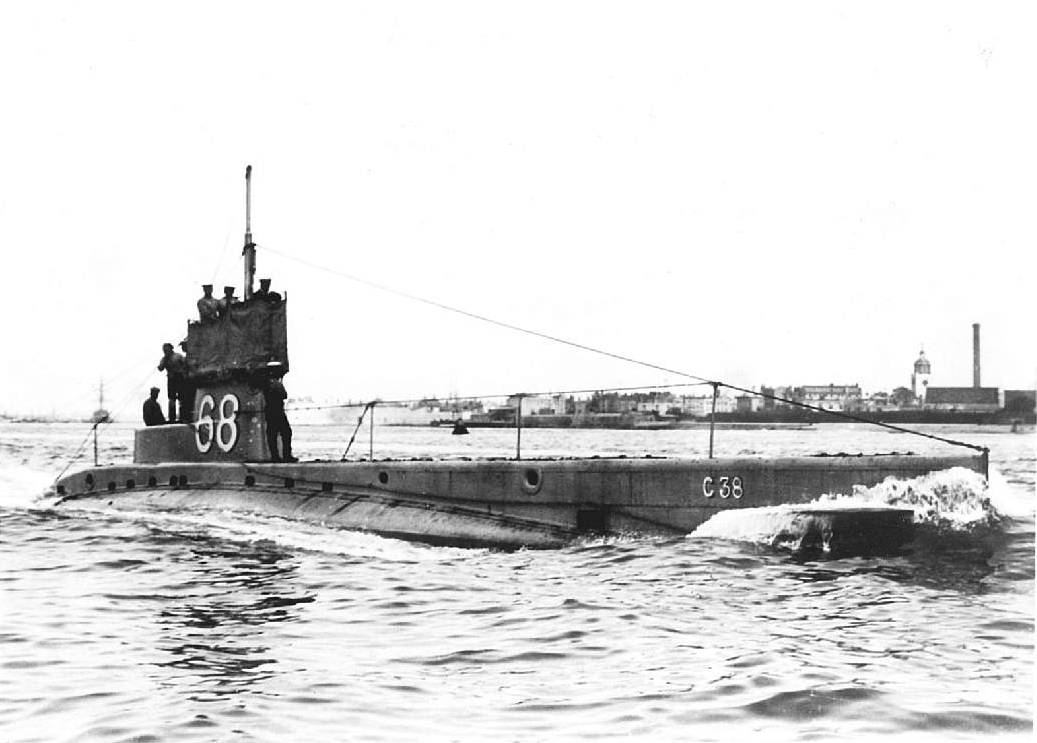
- HMS C38 - a typical C class submarine

History

United Kingdom
- Name: HMS C2
- Builder: Vickers, Barrow
- Laid down: 13 November 1905
- Launched: 10 July 1906
- Commissioned: 20 November 1906
- Fate: Sold for scrapping, 8 October 1920

General characteristics
- Class & type: C-class submarine
- Displacement: 287 long tons (292 t) surfaced; 316 long tons (321 t) submerged
- Length: 142 ft 3 in (43.4 m)
- Beam: 13 ft 7 in (4.1 m)
- Draught: 11 ft 6 in (3.5 m)
- Installed power: 600 bhp (450 kW) petrol; 300 hp (220 kW) electric
- Propulsion: 1 × 16-cylinder Vickers petrol engine; 1 × electric motor
- Speed: 12 kn (22 km/h; 14 mph) surfaced; 7 kn (13 km/h; 8.1 mph) submerged
- Range: 910 nmi (1,690 km; 1,050 mi) at 12 kn (22 km/h; 14 mph) on the surface
- Test depth: 100 feet (30.5 m)
- Complement: 2 officers and 14 ratings
- Armament: 2 × 18 in (450 mm) bow torpedo tubes

HMS C2 was one of 38 C-class submarines built for the Royal Navy in the first decade of the 20th century. The boat survived the First World War and was sold for scrap in 1920.

== Design and description ==
The C class was essentially a repeat of the preceding B class, albeit with better performance underwater. The submarine had a length of 142 feet 3 inches (43.4 m) overall, a beam of 13 feet 7 inches (4.1 m) and a mean draught of 11 feet 6 inches (3.5 m). They displaced 287 long tons (292 t) on the surface and 316 long tons (321 t) submerged. The C-class submarines had a crew of two officers and fourteen ratings.

For surface running, the boats were powered by a single 16-cylinder 600-brake-horsepower (447 kW) Vickers petrol engine that drove one propeller shaft. When submerged the propeller was driven by a 300-horsepower (224 kW) electric motor. They could reach 12 knots (22 km/h; 14 mph) on the surface and 7 knots (13 km/h; 8.1 mph) underwater. On the surface, the C class had a range of 910 nautical miles (1,690 km; 1,050 mi) at 12 knots (22 km/h; 14 mph).

The boats were armed with two 18-inch (45 cm) torpedo tubes in the bow. They could carry a pair of reload torpedoes, but generally did not as they would have to remove an equal weight of fuel in compensation.

== Construction and career ==
C2 was laid down on 13 November 1905 by Vickers at their Barrow-in-Furness shipyard, launched on 10 July 1906, and completed on 26 November. During World War I, the boat was generally used for coastal defence and training. C2 was sold for scrap on 8 October 1920.
