= SM U-40 (Germany) =

German Type U 31 U-boat

History

German Empire
- Name: U-40
- Ordered: 12 June 1912
- Builder: Germaniawerft, Kiel
- Yard number: 200
- Laid down: 3 April 1913
- Launched: 22 October 1914
- Commissioned: 14 February 1915
- Fate: Sunk 23 June 1915

General characteristics
- Class & type: Type U 31 submarine
- Displacement: 685 t (674 long tons) (surfaced); 878 t (864 long tons) (submerged)
- Length: 64.70 m (212 ft 3 in) (o/a); 52.36 m (171 ft 9 in) (pressure hull)
- Beam: 6.32 m (20 ft 9 in) (o/a); 4.05 m (13 ft 3 in) (pressure hull)
- Draught: 3.56 m (11 ft 8 in)
- Installed power: 2 × 1,850 PS (1,361 kW; 1,825 shp) diesel engines; 2 × 1,200 PS (883 kW; 1,184 shp) Doppelmodyn
- Propulsion: 2 × shafts; 2 × 1.60 m (5 ft 3 in) propellers
- Speed: 16.4 knots (30.4 km/h; 18.9 mph) (surfaced); 9.7 knots (18.0 km/h; 11.2 mph) (submerged)
- Range: 8,790 nmi (16,280 km; 10,120 mi) at 8 knots (15 km/h; 9.2 mph) (surfaced); 80 nmi (150 km; 92 mi) at 5 knots (9.3 km/h; 5.8 mph) (submerged)
- Test depth: 50 m (164 ft 1 in)
- Boats & landing craft carried: 1 dinghy
- Complement: 4 officers, 31 enlisted
- Armament: four 50 cm (20 in) torpedo tubes (2 each bow and stern); 6 torpedoes; one 8.8 cm (3.5 in) SK L/30 deck gun

Service record
- Part of: II Flotilla; Unknown start – 23 June 1915
- Commanders: Kptlt. Gerhardt Fürbringer; 14 February – 23 June 1915
- Operations: 1 patrol
- Victories: None

SM U-40 (Note: "SM" stands for "Seiner Majestät" (English: His Majesty's) and combined with the U for Unterseeboot would be translated as His Majesty's Submarine.) was a German Type U 31 U-boat of the German Imperial Navy (German: Kaiserliche Marine) during World War I.

Her construction was ordered on 12 June 1912 and her keel was laid down on 3 April 1913 by Germaniawerft of Kiel. She was launched on 22 October 1914 and commissioned on 14 February 1915 under the command of Gerhardt Fürbringer. Second officer was lieutenant Rudolf Jauch (of the Jauch family).

U-40 conducted one patrol, without sinking a ship.

== Design ==
Type U 31 submarines were double-hulled ocean-going submarines similar to Type 23 and Type 27 subs in dimensions and differed only slightly in propulsion and speed. They were considered very good high sea boats with average manoeuvrability and good surface steering.

U-40 had an overall length of 64.70 m (212 ft 3 in), her pressure hull was 52.36 m (171 ft 9 in) long. The boat's beam was 6.32 m (20 ft 9 in) (o/a), while the pressure hull measured 4.05 m (13 ft 3 in). Type 31s had a draught of 3.56 m (11 ft 8 in) with a total height of 7.68–8.04 m (25 ft 2 in – 26 ft 5 in). The boats displaced a total of 971 tonnes (956 long tons); 685 t (674 long tons) when surfaced and 878 t (864 long tons) when submerged.

U-40 was fitted with two Germania 6-cylinder two-stroke diesel engines with a total of 1,850 metric horsepower (1,361 kW; 1,825 bhp) for use on the surface and two Siemens-Schuckert double-acting electric motors with a total of 1,200 PS (883 kW; 1,184 shp) for underwater use. These engines powered two shafts each with a 1.60 m (5 ft 3 in) propeller, which gave the boat a top surface speed of 16.4 knots (30.4 km/h; 18.9 mph), and 9.7 knots (18.0 km/h; 11.2 mph) when submerged. Cruising range was 8,790 nautical miles (16,280 km; 10,120 mi) at 8 knots (15 km/h; 9.2 mph) on the surface, and 80 nmi (150 km; 92 mi) at 5 knots (9.3 km/h; 5.8 mph) under water. Diving depth was 50 m (164 ft 1 in).

The U-boat was armed with four 50 cm (20 in) torpedo tubes, two fitted in the bow and two in the stern, and carried 6 torpedoes. Additionally U-40 was equipped in 1915 with one 8.8 cm (3.5 in) Uk L/30 deck gun. The boat's complement was 4 officers and 31 enlisted.

== Fate ==
On the morning of 23 June 1915 U-40 stopped the trawler Taranaki in the North Sea. Taranaki was in fact a decoy vessel, or "Q-ship", and was connected to the submerged submarine HMS C24 by a combined tow line and telephone cable. When U-40 stopped the trawler, Taranaki telephoned the situation to C24. When C24 tried to slip the tow line, however, the release mechanism failed, and C24 had to manoeuvre into an attacking position with a hundred fathoms of chain hanging from her bow. Her commander, Lieutenant Frederick Henry Taylor, was able to adjust her trim and avoid fouling the chain in the propellers and fired a single torpedo that struck U-40 amidships. The U-boat sank instantly, only three men in the conning tower surviving to be picked up by Taranaki.

== Wreck discovery ==
The reported location of the sinking varied. According to some sources it was "50 nmi (93 km; 58 mi) southeast of Aberdeen". Others suggested it was "east of the Firth of Forth".

However, in March 2009 the Scottish company Marine Quest announced that divers from their company had discovered the wreck of U-40 approximately 40 nmi (74 km; 46 mi) off Eyemouth, Berwickshire, Scotland, "miles from where it was recorded as going down".

== Bibliography ==
- Beesly, Patrick (1982). Room 40: British Naval Intelligence 1914-1918. London: H Hamilton. ISBN 978-0-241-10864-2.
- Gröner, Erich; Jung, Dieter; Maass, Martin (1991). U-boats and Mine Warfare Vessels. German Warships 1815–1945. Vol. 2. Translated by Thomas, Keith; Magowan, Rachel. London: Conway Maritime Press. ISBN 0-85177-593-4.*Halpern, Paul G. (1995). A Naval History of World War I. New York: Routledge. ISBN 978-1-85728-498-0.
- Koerver, Hans Joachim (2008). Room 40: German Naval Warfare 1914-1918. Vol I., The Fleet in Action. Steinbach: LIS Reinisch. ISBN 978-3-902433-76-3.
- Koerver, Hans Joachim (2009). Room 40: German Naval Warfare 1914-1918. Vol II., The Fleet in Being. Steinbach: LIS Reinisch. ISBN 978-3-902433-77-0.
- Roessler, Eberhard (1997). Die Unterseeboote der Kaiserlichen Marine. Bonn: Bernard & Graefe. ISBN 978-3-7637-5963-7.
- Schroeder, Joachim (2002). Die U-Boote des Kaisers. Bonn: Bernard & Graefe. ISBN 978-3-7637-6235-4.
- Spindler, Arno (1966) [1932]. Der Handelskrieg mit U-Booten. 5 Vols. Berlin: Mittler & Sohn. Vols. 4+5, dealing with 1917+18, are very hard to find: Guildhall Library, London, has them all, also Vol. 1-3 in an English translation: The submarine war against commerce.
