= HMS C8 =

Submarine of the Royal Navy

History

United Kingdom
- Name: HMS C8
- Builder: Vickers, Barrow
- Laid down: 9 December 1905
- Launched: 15 February 1907
- Commissioned: 23 May 1907
- Fate: Sold, 22 October 1920

General characteristics
- Class & type: C-class submarine
- Displacement: 287 long tons (292 t) surfaced; 316 long tons (321 t) submerged
- Length: 142 ft 3 in (43.4 m)
- Beam: 13 ft 7 in (4.1 m)
- Draught: 11 ft 6 in (3.5 m)
- Installed power: 600 bhp (450 kW) petrol; 300 hp (220 kW) electric
- Propulsion: 1 × 16-cylinder Vickers petrol engine; 1 × electric motor
- Speed: 12 kn (22 km/h; 14 mph) surfaced; 7 kn (13 km/h; 8.1 mph) submerged
- Range: 910 nmi (1,690 km; 1,050 mi) at 12 kn (22 km/h; 14 mph) on the surface
- Test depth: 100 feet (30.5 m)
- Complement: 2 officers and 14 ratings
- Armament: 2 × 18 in (450 mm) bow torpedo tubes

HMS C8 was one of 38 C-class submarines built for the Royal Navy in the first decade of the 20th century. The boat survived the First World War and was sold for scrap in 1920.

== Design and description ==
The C class was essentially a repeat of the preceding B class, albeit with better performance underwater. The submarine had a length of 142 feet 3 inches (43.4 m) overall, a beam of 13 feet 7 inches (4.1 m) and a mean draught of 11 feet 6 inches (3.5 m). They displaced 287 long tons (292 t) on the surface and 316 long tons (321 t) submerged. The C-class submarines had a crew of two officers and fourteen ratings.

For surface running, the boats were powered by a single 16-cylinder 600-brake-horsepower (447 kW) Vickers petrol engine that drove one propeller shaft. When submerged the propeller was driven by a 300-horsepower (224 kW) electric motor. They could reach 12 knots (22 km/h; 14 mph) on the surface and 7 knots (13 km/h; 8.1 mph) underwater. On the surface, the C class had a range of 910 nautical miles (1,690 km; 1,050 mi) at 12 knots (22 km/h; 14 mph).

The boats were armed with two 18-inch (45 cm) torpedo tubes in the bow. They could carry a pair of reload torpedoes, but generally did not as they would have to remove an equal weight of fuel in compensation.

== Construction and career ==
C8 was laid down on 9 December 1905 by Vickers at their Barrow-in-Furness shipyard, launched on 15 February 1907 and completed on 23 May.

In 1910 C8 was part of the Nore Submarine Flotilla. On 16 December 1910 the flotilla, including C8 was leaving Harwich harbour when C8 collided with the tender HMS Elfin, which was carrying sailors back to the depot ship HMS Thames. Elfin sank with the loss of five men. During World War I, the boat was generally used for coastal defence and training. C8 was sold for scrap on 22 October 1920.
