= HMS C23 =

Submarine of the Royal Navy

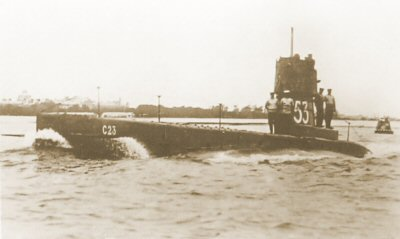
- HMS C23

History

United Kingdom
- Name: HMS C23
- Builder: Vickers, Barrow
- Laid down: 7 February 1908
- Launched: 26 November 1908
- Commissioned: 5 May 1909
- Fate: Sold, 5 December 1920

General characteristics
- Class & type: C-class submarine
- Displacement: 290 long tons (290 t) surfaced; 320 long tons (330 t) submerged
- Length: 142 ft 3 in (43.4 m)
- Beam: 13 ft 7 in (4.1 m)
- Draught: 11 ft 6 in (3.5 m)
- Installed power: 600 bhp (450 kW) petrol; 300 hp (220 kW) electric
- Propulsion: 1 × 16-cylinder Vickers petrol engine; 1 × electric motor
- Speed: 13 kn (24 km/h; 15 mph) surfaced; 8 kn (15 km/h; 9.2 mph) submerged
- Range: 910 nmi (1,690 km; 1,050 mi) at 12 kn (22 km/h; 14 mph) on the surface
- Test depth: 100 feet (30.5 m)
- Complement: 2 officers and 14 ratings
- Armament: 2 × 18 in (450 mm) bow torpedo tubes

HMS C23 was one of 38 C-class submarines built for the Royal Navy in the first decade of the 20th century. The boat survived the First World War and was sold for scrap in 1920.

== Design and description ==
The C-class boats of the 1907–08 and subsequent Naval Programmes were modified to improve their speed, both above and below the surface. The submarine had a length of 142 feet 3 inches (43.4 m) overall, a beam of 13 feet 7 inches (4.1 m) and a mean draught of 11 feet 6 inches (3.5 m). They displaced 290 long tons (290 t) on the surface and 320 long tons (330 t) submerged. The C-class submarines had a crew of two officers and fourteen ratings.

For surface running, the boats were powered by a single 12-cylinder 600-brake-horsepower (447 kW) Vickers petrol engine that drove one propeller shaft. When submerged the propeller was driven by a 300-horsepower (224 kW) electric motor. They could reach 13 knots (24 km/h; 15 mph) on the surface and 8 knots (15 km/h; 9.2 mph) underwater. On the surface, the C class had a range of 910 nautical miles (1,690 km; 1,050 mi) at 12 knots (22 km/h; 14 mph).

The boats were armed with two 18-inch (45 cm) torpedo tubes in the bow. They could carry a pair of reload torpedoes, but generally did not as they would have to remove an equal weight of fuel in compensation.

== Construction and career ==
HMS C23 was laid down on 7 February 1908 by Vickers at their Barrow-in-Furness shipyard, launched on 26 November, and completed on 5 May 1909. During World War I, the boat was generally used for coastal defence and training in home waters. C23 was sold on 5 December 1920.
