= HMS C7 =

Submarine of the Royal Navy

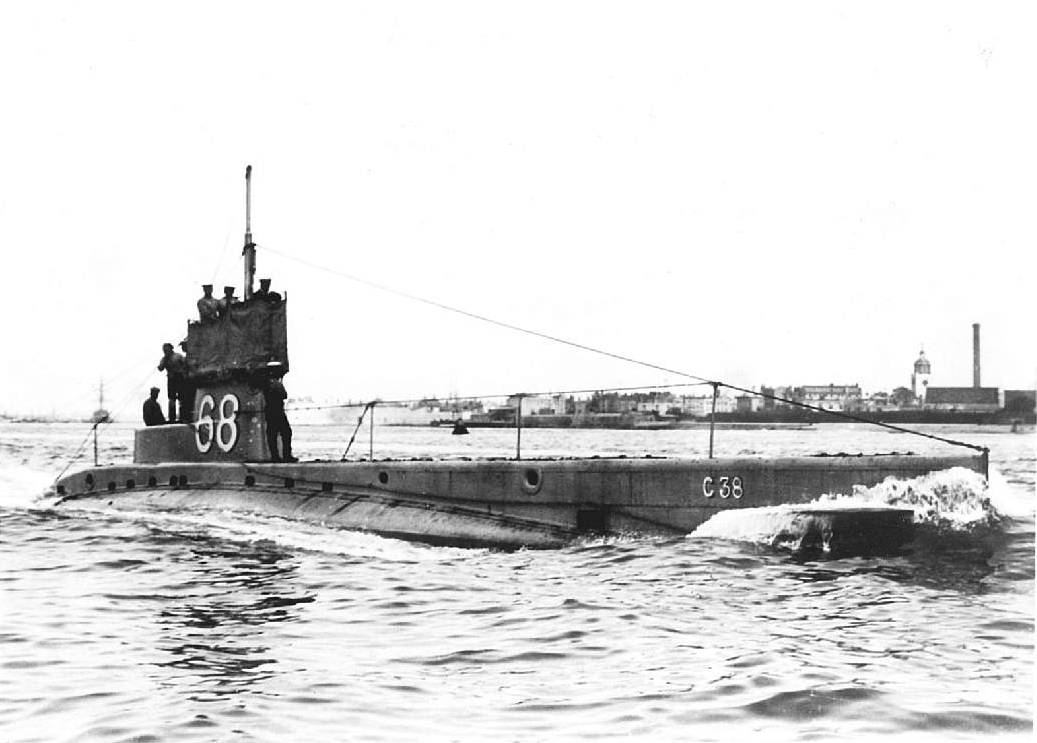
- HMS C38 - a typical C-class submarine

History

United Kingdom
- Name: HMS C7
- Builder: Vickers, Barrow
- Laid down: 9 December 1905
- Launched: 15 February 1907
- Commissioned: 23 May 1907
- Fate: Sold for scrapping, 20 December 1919

General characteristics
- Class & type: C-class submarine
- Displacement: 287 long tons (292 t) surfaced; 316 long tons (321 t) submerged
- Length: 142 ft 3 in (43.4 m)
- Beam: 13 ft 7 in (4.1 m)
- Draught: 11 ft 6 in (3.5 m)
- Installed power: 600 bhp (450 kW) petrol; 300 hp (220 kW) electric
- Propulsion: 1 × 16-cylinder Vickers petrol engine; 1 × electric motor
- Speed: 12 kn (22 km/h; 14 mph) surfaced; 7 kn (13 km/h; 8.1 mph) submerged
- Range: 910 nmi (1,690 km; 1,050 mi) at 12 kn (22 km/h; 14 mph) on the surface
- Test depth: 100 feet (30.5 m)
- Complement: 2 officers and 14 ratings
- Armament: 2 × 18 in (450 mm) bow torpedo tubes

HMS C7 was one of 38 C-class submarines built for the Royal Navy in the first decade of the 20th century. The boat survived the First World War and was sold for scrap in 1920.

== Design and description ==
The C class was essentially a repeat of the preceding B class, albeit with better performance underwater. The submarine had a length of 142 feet 3 inches (43.4 m) overall, a beam of 13 feet 7 inches (4.1 m) and a mean draught of 11 feet 6 inches (3.5 m). They displaced 287 long tons (292 t) on the surface and 316 long tons (321 t) submerged. The C-class submarines had a crew of two officers and fourteen ratings.

For surface running, the boats were powered by a single 16-cylinder 600-brake-horsepower (447 kW) Vickers petrol engine that drove one propeller shaft. When submerged the propeller was driven by a 300-horsepower (224 kW) electric motor. They could reach 12 knots (22 km/h; 14 mph) on the surface and 7 knots (13 km/h; 8.1 mph) underwater. On the surface, the C class had a range of 910 nautical miles (1,690 km; 1,050 mi) at 12 knots (22 km/h; 14 mph).

The boats were armed with two 18-inch (45 cm) torpedo tubes in the bow. They could carry a pair of reload torpedoes, but generally did not as they would have to remove an equal weight of fuel in compensation.

== Construction and career ==
C7 was built by Vickers at their Barrow-in-Furness shipyard, laid down on 9 December 1905 and was commissioned on 23 May 1907. The boat is often mistakenly credited with sinking UC-68 on 5 April 1917 off the coast of The Netherlands. However, this attack was made against UB-10, which survived. C7 was sold on 20 December 1919.
