= Caspar C 23 =

1920s German aircraft

C 23

General information
- Type: Sports plane
- National origin: Germany
- Manufacturer: Caspar-Werke
- Designer: Reinhold Mewes
- Number built: 1

History
- First flight: 1925

The Caspar C 23 was a German two-seat biplane sports aircraft that flew in 1925.

== Design and development ==
One C.23 was built, which received the civil registration D-648. It took part in the 1925 Deutschen Rundflug.

== Specifications ==
Data from

General characteristics

- Crew: 2
- Length: 7.00 m (23 ft 0 in)
- Wingspan: 10.00 m (32 ft 10 in)
- Empty weight: 480 kg (1,058 lb)
- Gross weight: 730 kg (1,609 lb)
- Powerplant: 1 × Mercedes D.I inline piston engine, 75 kW (100 hp)
- Propellers: 2-bladed fixed pitch propeller

Performance

- Maximum speed: 150 km/h (93 mph, 81 kn)
- Cruise speed: 135 km/h (84 mph, 73 kn)
