= HMS C11 =

C-class submarine built for the Royal Navy

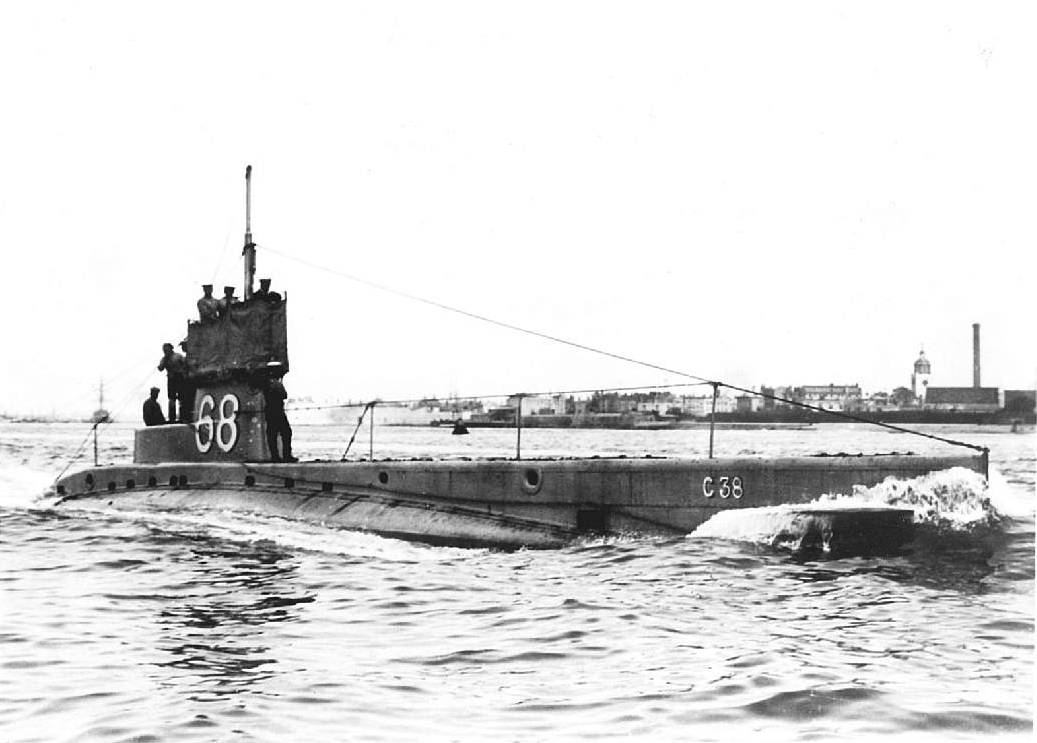
- HMS C38 – a typical C-class submarine

History

United Kingdom
- Name: HMS C11
- Builder: Vickers, Barrow
- Laid down: 6 April 1906
- Launched: 27 March 1907
- Commissioned: 3 September 1907
- Fate: Sunk in collision 14 July 1909

General characteristics
- Class & type: C-class submarine
- Displacement: 287 long tons (292 t) surfaced; 316 long tons (321 t) submerged
- Length: 142 ft 3 in (43.4 m)
- Beam: 13 ft 7 in (4.1 m)
- Draught: 11 ft 6 in (3.5 m)
- Installed power: 600 bhp (450 kW) petrol; 300 hp (220 kW) electric
- Propulsion: 1 × 16-cylinder Vickers petrol engine; 1 × electric motor
- Speed: 12 kn (22 km/h; 14 mph) surfaced; 7 kn (13 km/h; 8.1 mph) submerged
- Range: 910 nmi (1,690 km; 1,050 mi) at 12 kn (22 km/h; 14 mph) on the surface
- Test depth: 100 feet (30.5 m)
- Complement: 2 officers and 14 ratings
- Armament: 2 × 18 in (450 mm) bow torpedo tubes

HMS C11 was one of 38 C-class submarines built for the Royal Navy in the first decade of the 20th century. The boat was lost after being rammed in 1909.

== Design and description ==
The C class was essentially a repeat of the preceding B class, albeit with better performance underwater. The submarine had a length of 142 feet 3 inches (43.4 m) overall, a beam of 13 feet 7 inches (4.1 m) and a mean draught of 11 feet 6 inches (3.5 m). They displaced 287 long tons (292 t) on the surface and 316 long tons (321 t) submerged. The C-class submarines had a crew of two officers and fourteen ratings.

For surface running, the boats were powered by a single 16-cylinder 600-brake-horsepower (447 kW) Vickers petrol engine that drove one propeller shaft. When submerged the propeller was driven by a 300-horsepower (224 kW) electric motor. They could reach 12 knots (22 km/h; 14 mph) on the surface and 7 knots (13 km/h; 8.1 mph) underwater. On the surface, the C class had a range of 910 nautical miles (1,690 km; 1,050 mi) at 12 knots (22 km/h; 14 mph).

The boats were armed with two 18-inch (45 cm) torpedo tubes in the bow. They could carry a pair of reload torpedoes, but generally did not as they would have to remove an equal weight of fuel in compensation.

== Construction and career ==
C11 was built by Vickers at their Barrow-in-Furness shipyard, laid down on 6 April 1906 and was commissioned on 3 September 1907. The boat was sunk in a collision with the collier Eddystone in the North Sea south of Cromer, Norfolk on 14 July 1909. There were only three survivors. Attempts were made to salvage the stricken submarine but they were abandoned in September 1909, after only a single body had been recovered. The wreck was rediscovered in the late 1990s.
