= Hartwell (surname) =

Hartwell is a surname. Notable people with the surname include:

- Abraham Hartwell (the elder) (fl. 1565), English poet writing in Latin
- Abraham Hartwell (1553–1606), English translator and antiquarian
- Alfred S. Hartwell (1836–1912), American Civil War officer and Hawaii judge
- Alonzo Hartwell (1805–1873), American engraver and portrait artist
- Ambrose Hartwell (1883–??), English footballer
- Anthony Hartwell (1940–2023), British master mariner and baronet
- Michael Berry, Baron Hartwell (1911–2001), newspaper proprietor
- Brodrick C. D. A. Hartwell (1876–1948), British Army officer
- Brodrick Hartwell (1909–1993), British baronet
- Calvin Hartwell (died 1920), Mayor of Pasadena, California (1896–98)
- Charles Hartwell (1825–1905), American missionary
- Charles Leonard Hartwell (1873–1951), British sculptor
- David G. Hartwell (1941–2016), American science fiction and fantasy editor
- Dulcie Hartwell (1915–2012), South African trade union leader
- Edgerton Hartwell (born 1978), American football player
- Edward M. Hartwell (1850–1922), American academic
- Elizabeth S. Hartwell (1924–2000), American conservationist
- Emily Susan Hartwell (1859–1951), American missionary in China
- Erin Hartwell (born 1969), American cyclist
- Francis Hartwell (1757–1831), British Royal Navy officer
- Henry Hartwell (c.1641–1699), British lawyer and politician in the Colony of Virginia
- Indi Hartwell (born 1996), Australian professional wrestler
- Jack Hartwell Sr. (1902–1970), Australian rugby league footballer
- Jane Hartwell, American film producer
- J. Hartwell Harrison (1909–1984), American urologic surgeon and educator
- John A. Hartwell (1869–1940), American college football player and coach, military officer and physician
- John Hartwell (born c. 1965), American college athletics administrator
- Josephine Hartwell later Josephine Hartwell Shaw (1865–1941), American jeweler and metalworker
- Josh Hartwell (1869–1940), 19th-century American college football coach
- Leland H. Hartwell (born 1939), President and director of the Fred Hutchinson Cancer Research Center, Seattle; 2001 Nobel Prize laureate
- Lesley Hartwell (born 1949), South African lawn bowler
- Lori Hartwell, founder and president of the Renal Support Network
- Marten Hartwell (1925–2013), Canadian bush pilot
- Mary Hartwell (1747–1846), figure of the battles of Lexington and Concord
- Mary Hartwell (1847–1902), American author better known as Mary Hartwell Catherwood
- Peggie Hartwell (born 1939), African-American quilter and educator
- Robert Hartwell (1810–1875), British trade unionist and newspaper editor
- Ron Hartwell (died 2016), Canadian ice hockey player
- Ronald Max Hartwell (1921–2009, Australian-born economic historian
- Sharon Hartwell, Canadian politician
- William Hartwell (1880–??), English footballer

Fictional characters:

- Harley Hartwell, character from the manga series Case Closed
- Walter Hartwell White (Breaking Bad)
