= Charles Lester Kerr =

British naval officer and submarine commander

Commander Charles Kerr DSO
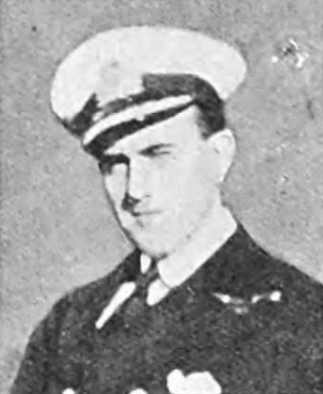
- Born: 16 November 1886; Folkestone, Kent
- Died: 29 October 1965 (aged 78); Torquay, Devon
- Burial place: Buckfast Abbey, Devon
- Spouse(s): Innes Chapman (m. 1908) Dorothea Martin-Smith (m. 1953)
- Military career
- Allegiance: United Kingdom
- Branch: Royal Navy
- Service years: 1901–1923
- Rank: Commander
- Commands: HMS A8; HMS C15; HMS C8
- Conflicts: First World War
- Awards: Mentioned in dispatches Order of Karađorđe's Star (Serbia); Order of the White Eagle (Serbia); Croix de Guerre (France); Order of the Crown of Italy

Commander Charles Lester Kerr, DSO (16 November 1886 – 29 October 1965) was a British naval officer and submarine commander.

He became a Naval Cadet at the age of fifteen and qualified for a career with the Royal Navy. He was later a submarine commander, but was transferred to shore duties because of nearsightedness. He spent a period in the coastguards before returning to active service at the beginning of World War I where he commanded a battery of land based naval guns in support of the Serbian army. During his time in Serbia he was credited with sinking an Austrian warship by using a picket boat to launch a torpedoes attack, for which he received the DSO. After his return to the UK he was posted to Belgium in command of a land based battery of heavy naval guns. He was later transferred to Egypt, where he co-ordinated convoy movements in the Mediterranean Sea before returning to coastguard duties after the war.

He left the navy in 1923 and purchased the luxury 300 ft yacht Istar with the intention of using it for a business venture, but the refurbishment costs proved to be prohibitive. He formed a partnership with others, including Alfred Ehrenreich, with the intention of using the vessel as a factory ship to catch and process sharks in Australia. In 1930 he was arrested and charged with blackmailing a prospective parliamentary candidate. He was cleared of this charge, and at the beginning of the Second World War he returned to the navy in a training role during which time he was seriously injured.

== Background ==
Kerr was born 16 November 1886 in Folkestone, Kent. His mother was Ada Jessie Wilson (1864–1896), a daughter and granddaughter respectively of the painters John James Wilson and John "Jock" Wilson. His father was Captain Schomberg Kerr (1861–1930), formally of the Rifle Brigade, who was descended from General William John Kerr, 5th Marquess of Lothian. Kerr's mother died when he was ten years old; his father remarried in 1904 to divorcee, Rosa Williamina (Dymock) Williams (1861–1926).

Kerr attended private schools, first in Eastbourne, Sussex, and then Fareham, Surrey, in preparation for his entry examinations to the Royal Naval training establishment at Dartmouth. Several members of the Kerr family had careers in the military. Kerr's father had been in the army whilst others were in the Royal Navy including Lord Walter Kerr (the fourth son of the 7th Marquess of Lothian), who was the First Sea Lord. Kerr passed his entry exams, coming sixteenth in order of merit out of about 200, and in September 1901 began his training in Dartmouth. This was before the construction of the current Britannia Royal Naval College when the training was undertaken onboard two hulks, HMS Britannia (formally HMS Prince of Wales) and HMS Hindostan.

In January 1903 Kerr received his first appointment as a naval cadet on the newly commissioned armoured cruiser HMS Drake. He served under Francis Bridgeman and John Jellicoe, 1st Earl Jellicoe, both of whom would become First Sea Lords. In 1905 Kerr's cousin, Mark Edward Frederic Kerr, became captain of the Drake. In 1906 Kerr was promoted from midshipman to sub-lieutenant and left the Drake to return to the UK for training at various establishments including the Royal Naval College, Greenwich.

== Submarines ==
Kerr had applied for transfer to the submarine service but was frustrated with refusals. He served on various ships during this period including HMS Dee, HMS Nith, HMS Roxburgh and HMS Donegal. In 1908 he finally got his transfer and after about five months of training was appointed to HMS Thames, the parent ship of the Harwich submarine flotilla. He was second in command of HMS C2 and after about 18 month was given his own command of submarine HMS A8 at Devonport. Later he was given command of HMS C15 and later HMS C8. In 1913 questions were raised about his eyesight. He was instructed to attend a medical, the outcome of which was that he was relieved of his command and reduced to half pay. He took his appeal to the top and was given an interview with the First Lord of the Admiralty, Winston Churchill. As a result, he was offered a post as a divisional officer with the Coastguards in Ireland, which he accepted.

== Coastguard ==
At this time the Admiralty were responsible for the Coastguard service, which was almost exclusively manned by personnel from the Royal Navy on half pay. Kerr was stationed at Newcastle, County Down, at a time when gun smuggling had become an issue. His area of control was from Portaferry to Kilkeel and he had about thirty people working for him. It was in the next district to the north that a large consignment of rifles and ammunition were smuggled in for the Ulster Volunteer Force during April 1914.

After Britain's declaration of war with Germany in August 1914, Kerr wrote to the head of the submarine service hoping for a return to an active role in the Royal Navy. In September he was told to report to HMS Vulcan, the submarine depot ship in Leith. Kerr hoped to be given command of a submarine but came to realise that the issue of his eyesight weakness precluded this. He made enquiries at the Admiralty about other opportunities and was offered the job as Rear Admiral Troubridge's flag lieutenant during a military mission to Serbia. He accepted and was given the rank of Lieutenant-Commander.

== Serbia ==
As a consequence of the assassination of Archduke Franz Ferdinand of Austria in 1914, the Austrian government declared war on Serbia on 28 July of the same year. (Note: see Wikipedia article July Crisis for detailed explanation) Their forces were initially repelled by the Serbian army and a standoff developed across the rivers Danube and Sava. Russia, France and Britain allied themselves with the Serbians and sent in small detachments to provide support. To restrict the movement of Austrian warships on the Danube and Sava the British deployed mines and installed static torpedo tubes on the banks of the rivers. Rear Admiral Troubridge, commanding a small force with eight 4.7 inch guns on Scott Carriages and a 56 ft picket boat, deployed to the front line. The guns were divided into four batteries of two guns with a Serbian artillery officer in command of each. Men from the Royal Navy and Royal Marine Artillery operated the guns; they were supported by as many as ninety Serbians, many of whom were responsible for the oxen used to move the guns.

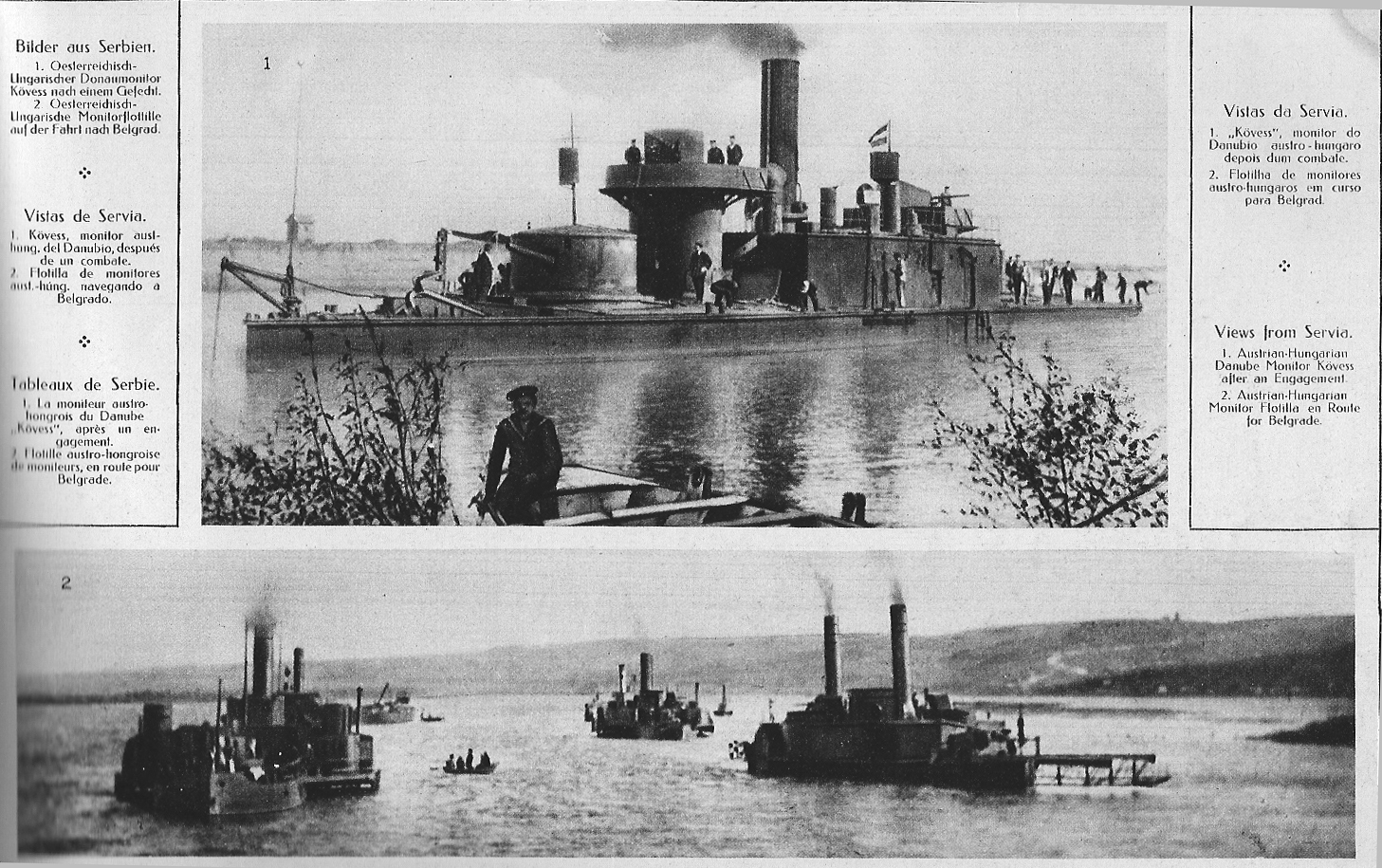
Austrian monitors on the Danube c1916

The picket boat had been transported overland from Salonika on the railroad, requiring some ingenuity to overcome various logistic difficulties. It was fitted with two cradles, one per side, to hold torpedoes that could be lowered into the water if and when required. On the nights of 22 and 23 April 1915 Kerr was using the picket boat to reconnoitre the reaches of the Danube west of Zemun. He was instructed by Troubridge not to endanger the craft. Eventually the crew spotted the silhouette of the Austrian monitors. As they approached they were challenged by a lookout and Kerr immediately ordered the first torpedo to be fired. This dramatically affected the trim the picket boat which swung off course. Corrective action was taken and Kerr fired the second torpedo. The first one failed to explode but as they turned away the second torpedo hit the target and there was a large explosion. After this attack the Austrians took defensive action to reduce the risk to their ships by installing protective booms. Kerr was awarded the Distinguished Service Order for the "enterprise being boldly and skillfully conducted". Later he was awarded the Serbian medals Order of Kara-George, with swords (4th class) and Order of the White Eagle (4th class). In 1917 the British Prize Court found that the crew of the picket boat were entitled to a total of £405 for the sinking of the monitor.

When the Austrian offensive started in October 1915 the picket boat was destroyed at its mooring by Austrian shell fire. Kerr was ordered to evacuate from Belgrade and report to Torlak. Two of the British 4.7 inch guns had been destroyed during an exchange of fire, but the remaining six were still serviceable. Kerr was instructed by Troubridge to place himself and these guns at the disposal of the Serbian command. Orders came to move the guns to Nish to help combat the Bulgarian incursion into Serbia. They used the guns in an attempt to slow the Bulgarian advance over the Morava River, but another two guns were lost during this action. The remaining four were ordered to withdraw further west to Mitrovica, via Prokuplje, Zuršumlija and Prishtina. The journey took seven days, slowed by the congestion of retreating Serbian troops, the blizzards and the exhaustion of oxen and men. When they arrived at Prishtina the situation was such that Kerr was told to use his judgement in regard to the future of the guns. He referred to Troubridge who approved the movement of the guns west to Petch (Peć). After setting out on the 22 November one of the guns sunk into a swamp on the road. The combined effort of oxen, lorries and men could not shift it, so eventually it had to be wrecked and within a few hours a second gun suffered a similar fate. On 26 November a third gun was lost when it fell through a bridge and had to be wrecked. The final gun was destroyed on the 28 November and all remaining ammunition buried.

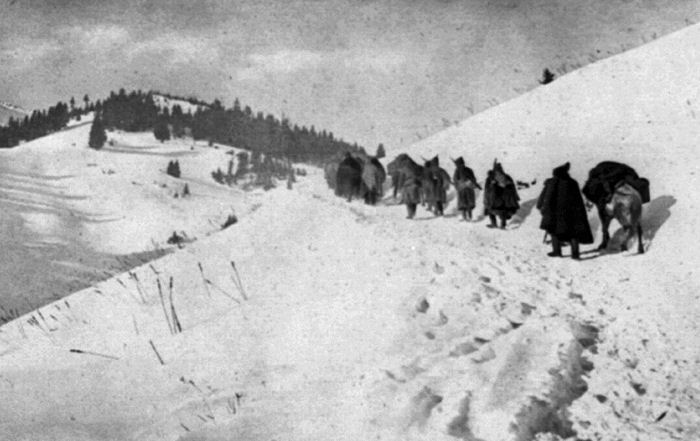
Serbians retreating through Albanian mountains

With the loss of the guns, and the Serbian army in retreat, Kerr's priority was to get his men to safety through the mountains of Montenegro and Albania. They had little food, no transport, it was winter and progress was slowed by the retreating Serbian army and refugees. (Note: see Wikipedia article Serbian army's retreat through Albania for background information) This part of their journey began on the 3 December and the detachment arrived in Scutari, Albania on the 16 December. A further two days march was required to get to the port of San Giovanni di Medua (Shëngjin), and from there by ship the troops were sent to Brindsi, Italy and Malta. Kerr remained behind with Troubridge, who had been assisting the Serbian High Command with co-ordinating relief supplies. The small harbour was under threat from air and sea attack and the invading armies had advanced to within a few miles when the British contingent left for Brindisi on 19 January 1916.

Kerr, Troubridge and their party made their escape on an Italian destroyer and transferred to the Royal Navy HMS Queen based in Taranto on the 21 January. From there they travelled to Rome for a debrief with the diplomatic corps. Kerr, who was from a Catholic family, made tentative enquiries at the Vatican about being granted an audience with Pope Benedict XV. To his surprise this was granted, and after a brief discussion with the Pope he was given the Apostolic Benediction.

== Nieuport siege guns ==
Kerr returned to England and after recuperation was given a role as an executive officer in a naval training school at Chingford. He pestered naval command for a more active appointment and in May 1916 joined the Royal Naval Siege Gun Unit at Lewin Camp, Nieuport, Belgium. Although manned by British Royal Navy and Marine gun crews, the unit was in the French sector and under their control. Kerr was given command of a pair of early static 9.2 inch naval guns that had yet to be found a suitable emplacement. Fortunately a French heavy gun was to be moved and Kerr was allocated the vacant bunker. Another such bunker had to be constructed to house the second gun and a platoon of Canadian Royal Engineers took on the task. The work took place at night to avoid detection by enemy spotter planes, and the site was camouflaged during the day. These bunkers were of heavily reinforced concrete construction, covered with a huge number of sand-bags to a depth of at least 6 ft and more. The two guns, named Barrington and Eastney, weighed about 15 tons each, and Kerr had neither the knowledge nor machinery to move them. Fortunately a specialist team run by Commander William G. H. Bickford DSO (1869–1932) was available put the guns in place. (Note: Bickford was a retired officer who operated as a contractor specialising in the movement of heavy equipment)

One of the targets chosen by the French artillery staff officer was two German 11 inch howitzers sited four miles away. For about a year periodic exchanges of fire took place between the howitzers and the British guns. If an incoming shell landed on or near the bunker, the sandbags provided protection but the explosion reduced their number, so frantic efforts to replace these took place during the lull in the bombardments. A second battery of two 9.2 inch guns was added towards the end of 1916. This was named Carnac and sited about 1000 yards to the rear of Barrington and Eastney; the officer put in charge of Carnac was Jameson Adams, the Antarctic explorer whose wife was Phoebe Carnac Thompson Fisher. In late February 1917 a German howitzer shell struck Barrington's gun port – the most vulnerable part of the bunker – and destroyed the gun. There was only one, minor, casualty and the gun was replaced by early April. In December 1917 Barrington succumbed to a five-day relentless bombardment from the German howitzer which damaged the bunker beyond repair. About this time the Royal Marine Artillery took over the batteries at Lewin, and Kerr was transferred to Egypt. In 1917 the Croix de Guerre was conferred on Kerr by the President of the French Republic.

== Port convoy officer ==
Initially Kerr had received orders to report to Rear Admiral commanding the British Adriatic Squadron and take over the role of Port Convoy Officer (PCO) in Taranto, Italy. Within two days of his arrival the orders had changed; he was instructed to report to Malta and told he would now be the PCO in Port Said, Egypt with rank of acting commander. The convoy system had evolved to counter the threat from submarine warfare. Merchant ships gathered together in Port Said and were escorted to their destination by warships or armed merchantmen. Other counter measures included mine sweeping and the use of seaplanes to hunt for enemy submarines. Intelligence gathering also identified where submarines may be operating so that convoys could be routed around these zones. Kerr's section co-ordinated the movement of 301 convoys between the date of his appointment in January 1918 and armistice in November. However, one misunderstanding in March 1918 lead to the loss of three Greek merchant ships, sunk by enemy submarines with the death of many sailors. The convoy authority in Malta had cabled Kerr with details of the route that this convoy was to take. Kerr knew this route passed through one of the areas where U-boats were operating, and he also knew that the PCO in Malta would have been aware of this fact. In consequence he did not question the instruction, which he said came from his superior. However, the Admiralty attributed blame to Kerr, which he challenged and later learned that he had been exonerated informally, but not publicly. In 1919 Kerr was awarded The Order of the Crown of Italy (Cavalier) by the King of Italy.

After the war Kerr returned to Britain and for a period was a training officer in the Royal Navy Volunteer Reserve. In 1920 he rejoined the coastguards, taking over the Boston Division that extended from Grimsby to King's Lynn. In 1923 the coastguard service transferred to the Board of Trade and Kerr took retirement from the Royal Navy.

== Civilian life ==
After he left the Navy Kerr became involved in various enterprises. His maternal aunt (a daughter of the painter John James Wilson), Mary Baker (Wilson) Dawbarn (1847–1934), who had been widowed in 1917, was the proprietor of her husband's coal factor business. Kerr joined the company and borrowed about £20,000 from her to buy a 300 ft yacht to begin a luxury world cruise business. In return she was to receive £100 per month for the rest of her life. Details about the first world cruise were published in the UK and America naming Prince and Princess Andrew of Russia, Lord and Lady Teynham and Admiral Mark Kerr as being associated with the venture. The project came to nothing and the cost of renovating the yacht had proved too much for Kerr. Two new partners, who had previously expressed an interest in the yacht, came in to the business. One of these was Major Robin Thynne (1879–1936), an ex-army man.

=== Major Robin Thynne ===
Thynne's real name was Robert Thompson Tinn, born in Gateshead, County Durham whose father worked as an "iron turner" in the railway industry. He was the fourth of nine children, educated at a secondary school and local college. In 1900 he moved to London, where he became an associate of Toynbee Hall, the world's first university settlement. The 1901 census shows him lodging at the hall of residence, Balliol Hall, Whitechapel, and employed as an assurance society clerk. He was also involved with the labour reform movement in Britain and wrote articles for various publications.

In 1904 he married Mary Ann Walker of Kinsale, and in 1907 the couple moved to Vancouver, British Columbia, Canada. In 1916 he was back in Britain and joined the army. In Canada he had been involved with property finance but also started a lumber business; his experience of working with heavy equipment made him a suitable candidate for the Royal Army Service Corps. On the 26 September 1916 he officially changed his name by deed poll from Robert Thompson Tinn, to Robin Thynne. His army record was amended to reflect this change and his wife's name was now given as Dr Mildred Archer Thynne. Mary Walker, Thynne's first wife, was still alive so it appears that they had parted company. Towards the end of WWI Thynne transferred to the Royal Air Force by "special appointment" at the request of the Ministry of Munitions, and he was seconded to the Directorate of Aircraft Production.

When Thynne died in July 1936, several British newspapers reported that he had been a scientist, anthropologist, expert on cancer treatment, explosive expert, literary agent, author and that he had worked for the British secret service. During his final illness two doctors flew in from Switzerland to try and save him, and after his death a package of documents was taken from his home and destroyed. Reporters tried to find out more about him and visited the area where he lived in Cornwall. Local people were interviewed and most seemed amazed at the interest being shown in the Major, but could add little information of interest. However, one newspaper took a different view of Thynne, saying that he had been a fraudster and was under police investigation at the time of his death. In the late 1920s he invested money in the Mandrake Press and associated with the English occultist and novelist, Aleister Crowley. They both had a relationship with a young lady called Deirdre Patricia Maureen Doherty, (Note: Doherty was the grand-daughter of painter Thomas Cooper Gotch and daughter of Phyllis Maureen Gotch, Marquise de Verdieres) with whom Crowley had a child.

=== The Dawbarn Trust ===
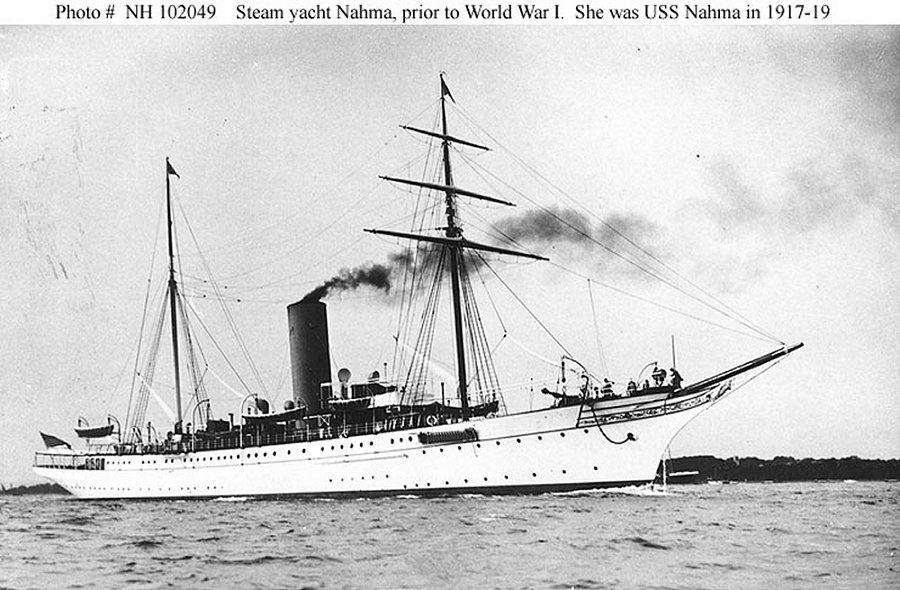
Nahma/Istar

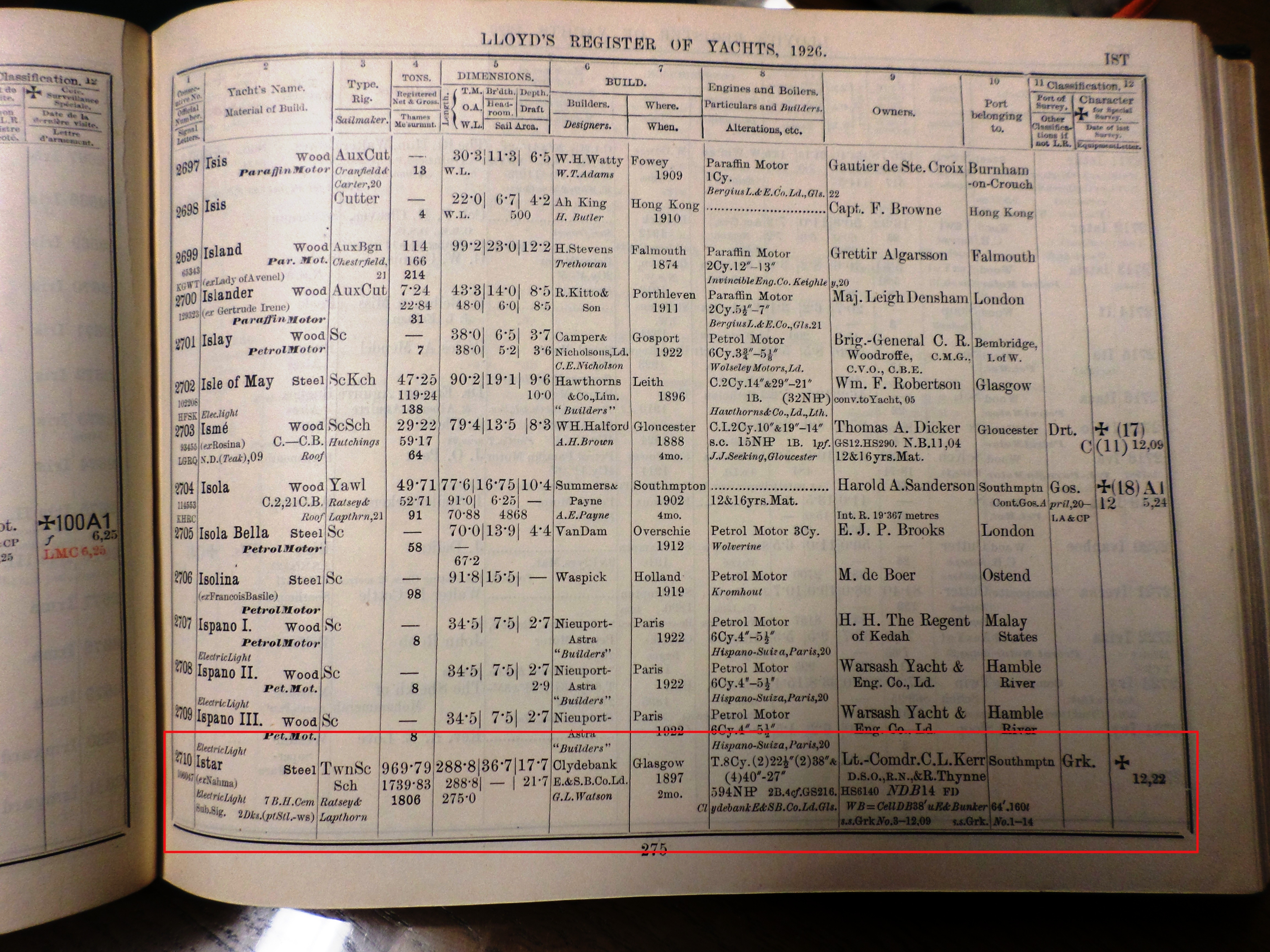
1926 Lloyd's yacht register Istar

Kerr and Thynne agreed to combine their business interests equally on a shared profit and loss basis. Thynne had interests in three companies at this time: Organisations Ltd., R. L. Sandifer & Co. and Triumph Soap Co. Ltd. Kerr's aunt had assigned the coal business of A. G. Dawbarn to him under a deed of gift, but due to the industrial unrest and coal strikes of 1925 and 1926 it lost money and had to be closed. He still retained the yacht and a company called Household Coal (Southend) Ltd. Thynne and Kerr also purchased a funfair ride called Witching Waves. These businesses were combined under a holding company called Dawbarn Trust. Another director, Dr Alfred Ehrenreich, was appointed. He had started a business in America that caught and processed sharks to obtain commercial quantities of oils, chemicals, fertilizers, food and leather. He held patents on many of the processes and wanted to expand the operation to Europe and the southern hemisphere, using Kerr's yacht as a floating factory. To achieve this the three directors set up a company called Marine Products Limited, and funded it by the sale of shares to the public.

The yacht was called Istar, a 300 ft luxury yacht, built in 1897 for New York property millionaire Robert Goelet, and originally named Nahma. After Goelet's death the yacht stayed in family hands, but in WWI it was transferred to the US Navy. During the prohibition years in America it had been used as a rum-runner for Sir Brodrick C. D. A. Hartwell, who lost money on the venture. Kerr and Thynne sold their interest in the yacht to Marine Products in exchange for 250,000 ordinary shares. Ehrenreich sold his British and Colonial patent rights to the company using this same arrangement. The yacht's conversion to a factory ship included the installation of leather tanning drums, tanks, incinerators, oil extraction and drying plant for fins and meat; the main deck was reserved for handling the catch and for the ten motor boats used in catching the sharks. The Istar could process thirty tons of sharks per, day with sufficient storage for a hundred days work.

Kerr was appointed the overseas director and went to New Zealand and Australia to negotiate for fishing rights, permits and local funding. He was later joined by Ehrenreich, but arrangements did not go as planned. The whole venture was based on Ehrenreich's theories about shark migration routes and size of the population. Some of the expert shark hunter he employed started to have doubts and left. Ehrenreich's unrealistic demands for more expensive equipment also unsettled investors. Kerr had disagreements with him and returned to England, where he discovered that his remunerations as a director of Marine Products had been disputed. He took the company to court to recover what he believed he was rightfully owed, but lost the case; to make matters worse a counter claim went against him leaving him in a poor financial situation.

In 1928 winding-up procedures were instigated against Dawbarn Trust and in 1932 against Marine Products in an attempt to recover some money. The yacht Istar had been standing idle in the East India Dock, London for about a year after conversion to a factory ship. It was leased to a French company but ran aground in Madagascar, refloated and towed to South Africa. It was hoped to start commercial shark processing there, but investors withdrew after adverse publicity. Istar was eventually scuttled off the coast of Durban.

== Blackmail accusations ==
Shortly after leaving the navy, Kerr lost about £2800 in a business venture. The person he considered responsible for this was later found guilty of fraudulent conversion and sent to jail for six months. Some years later Kerr read in a newspaper that this person was a parliamentary candidate in a forthcoming general election. Believing that he was now in possession of some wealth, Kerr approached him and demanded he be repaid the money he was owed (about £1500) or he would reveal his past misconducts. The man went to the police, who eavesdropped on a telephone conversation between him and Kerr. On the strength of this, Kerr was arrested and sent for trial at the Central Criminal Courts, London, on a charge of blackmail. The name of the man was never revealed; he was always referred to at the trial as “Mr Y”.

Kerr was able to provide documentary evidence showing that "Mr Y" owed him the money; character witnesses such as Jameson Adams, Admiral Mark Kerr and Sir Herbert Matthews spoke of Kerr's war record, honesty and integrity. The judge told the jury that if they considered Kerr had used the threat of publishing of "Mr Y's" past in order to wring money out of him he was guilty, but they may consider him not guilty if he had used a somewhat heated and unwise method of persuasion in order to collect a proven debt. The jury also had to consider the evidence of a convicted fraudster against that of a decorated war hero, and they took only 45 minutes to find Kerr not guilty.

== World War II ==
Kerr returned to the Royal Navy at the start of WWII in a training role. He sustained a fractured femur and his records indicate that he was fitted with artificial limb. He continued shore based sedentary duties and was eventually retired in 1945.

== Family ==
Kerr married Innes Margaret Annie Chapman (1880–1953) in 1908 and they had one child, Mark Barrington Kerr (1910–1982). After Margaret's death in March 1953, Kerr remarried to Dorothea Blanchard Muir (Reeves) Martin-smith (1893–1970), in April of the same year. Kerr was living at St. Benets, Buckfast, Devon, when he died 29 October 1965 in the Torbay Clinic, St. Lukes Road, Torquay. Probate at Exeter on 17 December was to Dorothea Blanchard Kerr, his widow. They are buried together in St Mary, Buckfast Abbey burial ground, Buckfast, Devon, England.

== Notes ==
References
