= Hauschka (disambiguation) =

Hauschka is the alias of Düsseldorf-based pianist and composer Volker Bertelmann.

Hauschka may also refer to:

== People ==
- Jiří Hauschka (born 1965), Czech painter
- Rudolf Hauschka (1891–1969), Austrian chemist and businessman
- Stephen Hauschka (born 1985), American football player
- Vincent Houška or Hauschka (1766–1840), Austrian cellist and composer

== Companies ==
- Dr. Hauschka, German beauty brand founded by Rudolf Hauschka
