= Jurlique =

Australian multinational cosmetics manufacturer and retail chain

Jurlique International Pty Ltd
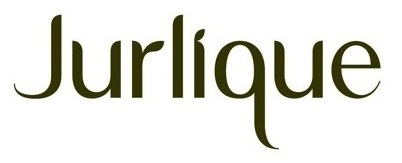

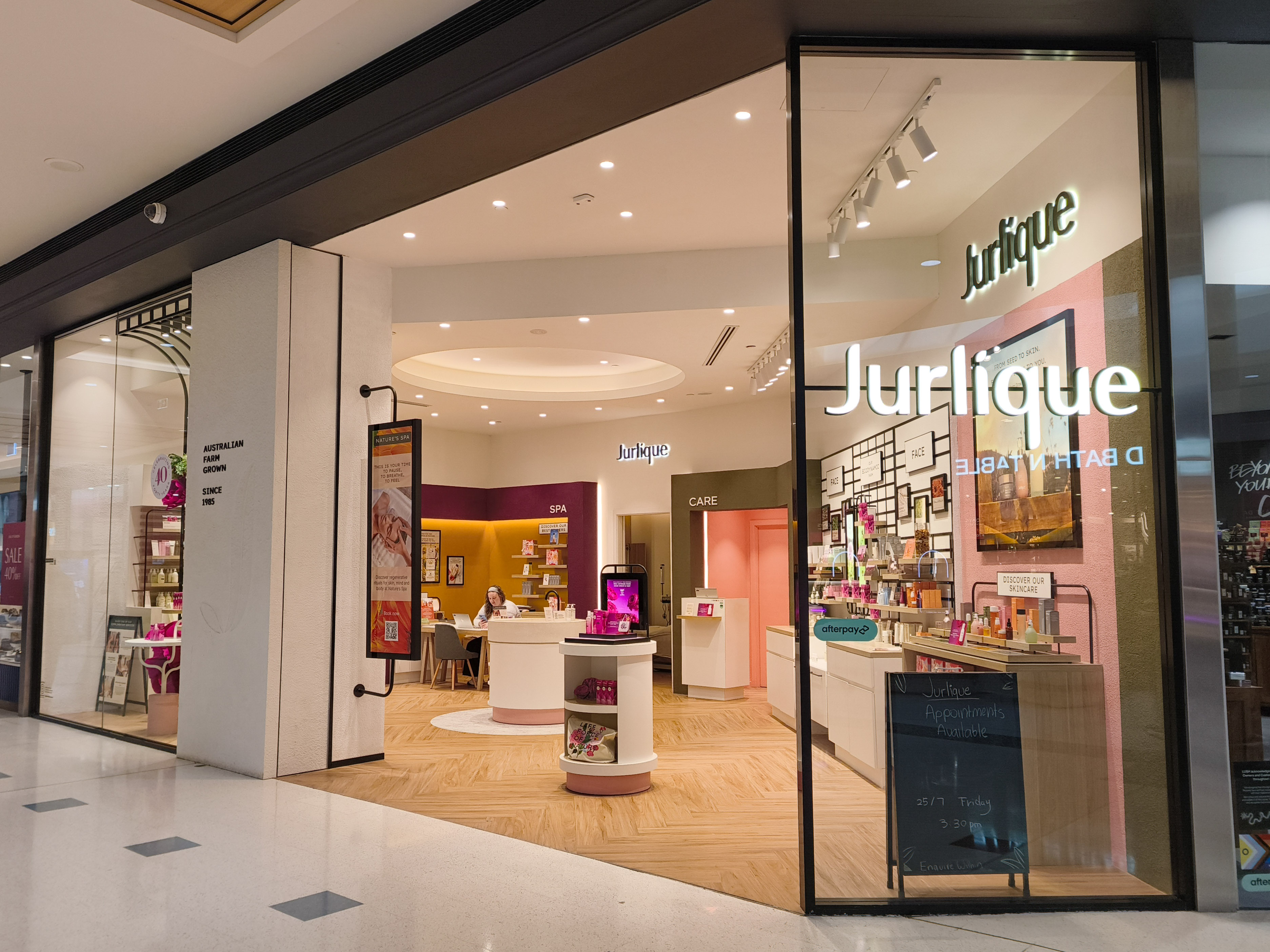
- Jurlique store in Westfield Booragoon
- Company type: Subsidiary
- Industry: Consumer goods
- Founded: 1985
- Founder: Jurgen Klein; Ulrike Klein
- Headquarters: Australia
- Products: Cosmetics & beauty
- Parent: Pola Orbis Holdings
- Website: www.jurlique.com

Jurlique International Pty Ltd, is an Australian cosmetics manufacturer specialising in natural botanical-based skincare and cosmetics under the brand name Jurlique. Jurlique is considered ethical and environmentally friendly, although internationally, it does submit some samples for animal testing as mandated by Chinese local laws for products sold in that market.

== History ==
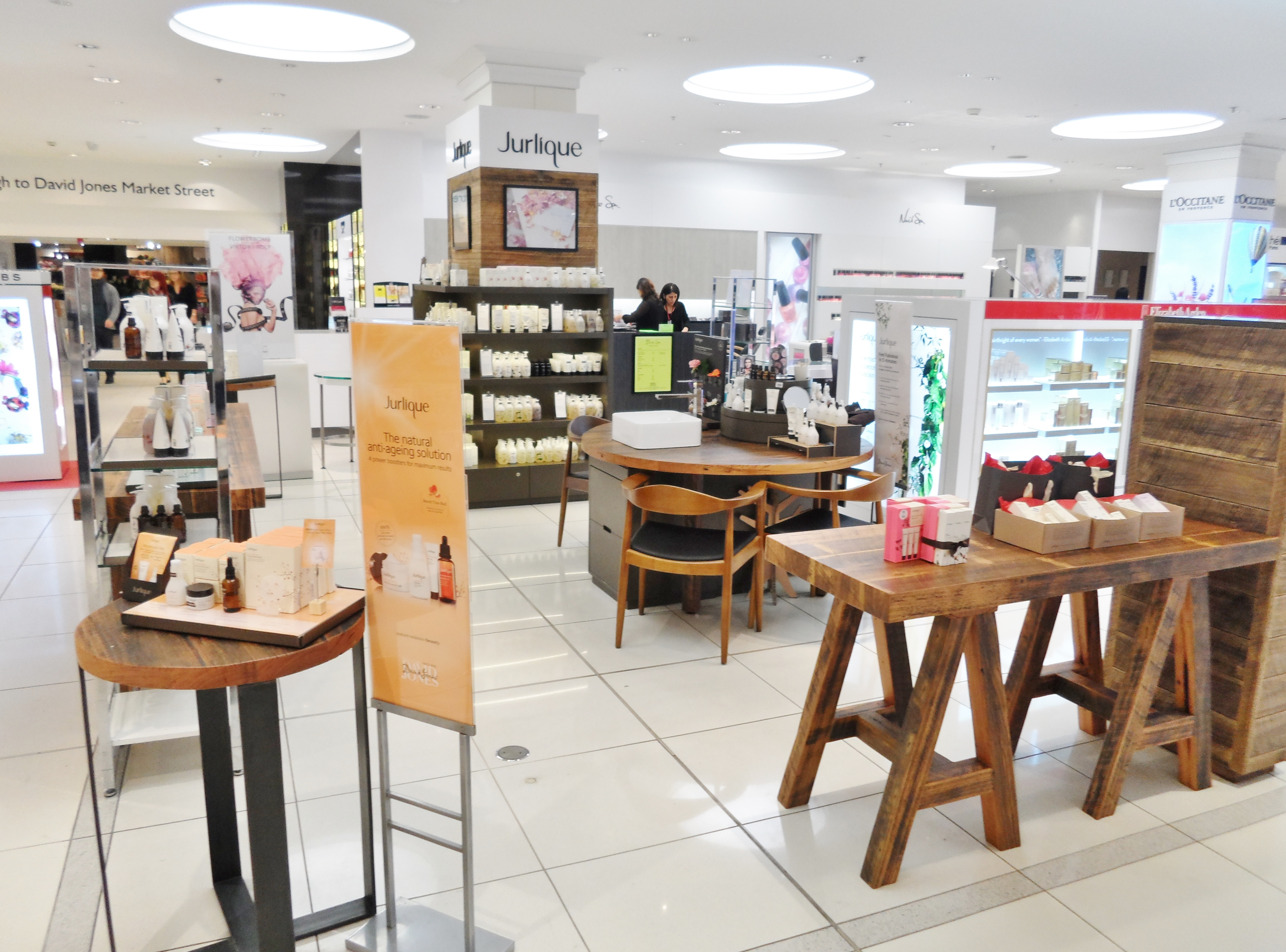
Jurlique counter at David Jones, Elizabeth Street, Sydney

Jurlique was founded in 1985 in South Australia by Dr Jurgen Klein and his wife Ulrike. The company's name is based on a phonetic combination of their first names. The native German couple relocated to a farm in the Adelaide Hills a year prior to the launch of their brand, due to its warm climate. Jurgen was a biochemist and naturopath, who had previously worked for German holistic skincare brand Dr. Hauschka. and Ulrike was a horticulturalist and botanist. Today the farm is still part of the company and Jurlique claims to be the number two prestige skincare brand in Australia. The brand is sold in over 5,000 stores worldwide, including over 58 Jurlique concept stores, 18 of which located across Australia.

== Ownership ==
Originally created as a niche natural skincare range, in 2002, the company was purchased for $25 million by Australian billionaire businessman Kerry Packer. Packer's son James, along with American companies Triarc and JH Partners resold the company in 2011. Public Japanese company Pola Orbis Holdings purchased Jurlique for $355 million. Orbis plans to expand the business, particularly into Asia.

== Media ==
Julia Roberts' character (Cpt. Katherine "Kate" Hazeltine) was shown using Jurlique hand cream in an airplane rest room during the 2010 film Valentine's Day.
