= Alfred Ehrenreich =

Alfred Ehrenreich (1882–1931) was a Moravian-born American immigrant who developed and advanced the trade of wide scale shark harvesting. He had been fascinated by sharks from an early age. He helped to start a business in America that caught and processed them in large numbers commercially. He believed they were a limitless resource from which oils, chemicals, fertilizers, food and leather could be obtained. He later attempted to expand the business to Europe, Africa and Australia.

== Background ==
Ehrenreich, was from Moravia and moved to America in 1914; he was described as an ex-banker, chemist and naturalist. His parents, who lived in Vienna, were Rosalie Konag and Moritz Ehrenreich. He married Margaret Elsa (Grete) Koehler (1893–1960) from Dresden, Germany, on 4 December 1916 in Manhattan and naturalized as an American citizen in 1920. He was financially independent and well connected. In 1917, with fellow investors, he launched the Ocean Leather Company for tanning and refining shark hides. Reports at the registration indicated that the company was capitalised at $41 million. Ehrenreich was the company president, and Dr Russell J. Coles (1865–1928) - who was a knowledgeable deep sea fisherman and fishing buddy of Theodore Roosevelt - was a director and honorary president.

== Dermal denticles ==
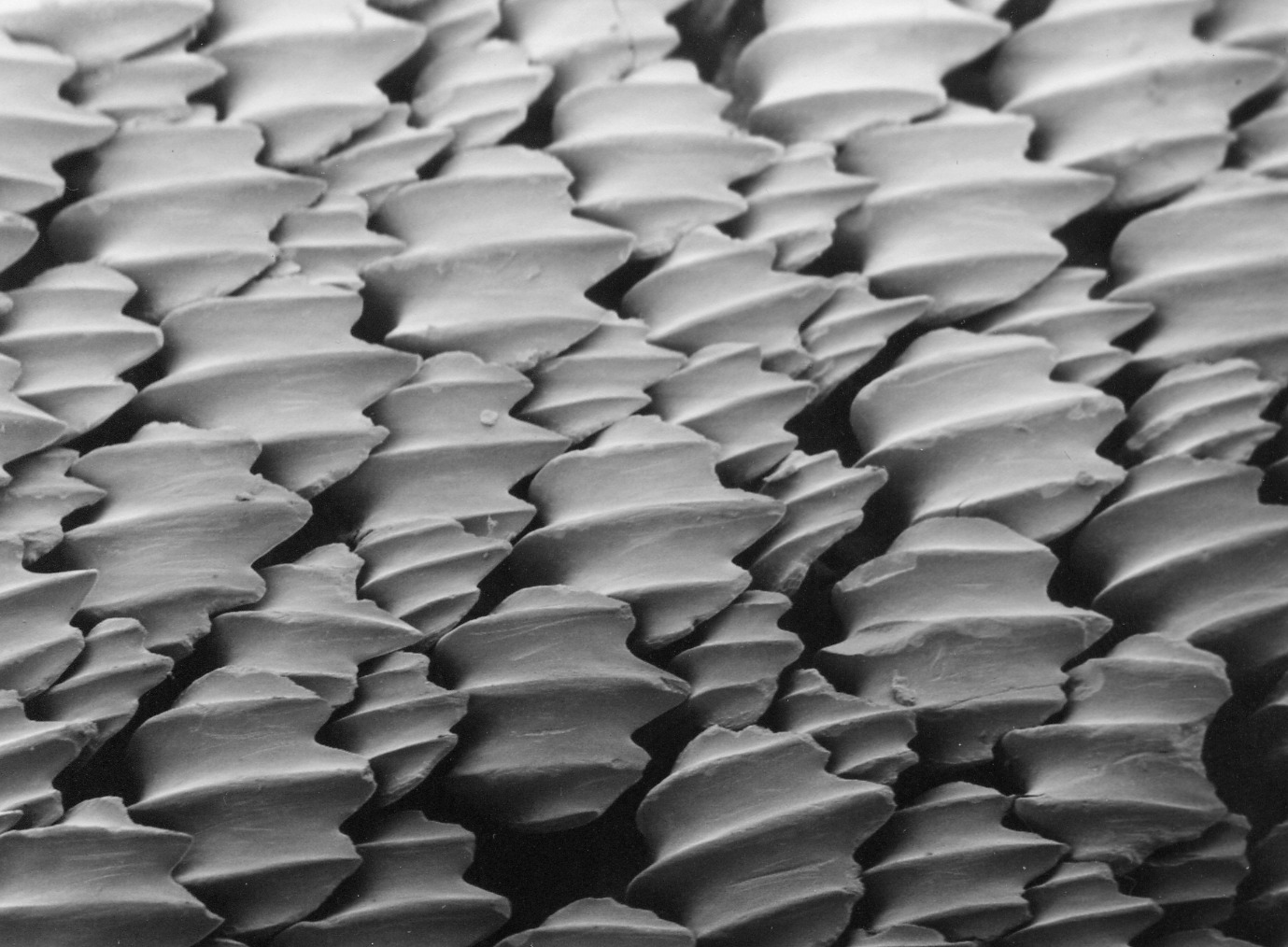
Placoid scales as viewed through an electron microscope. Also called dermal denticles, these are structurally homologous with vertebrate teeth.

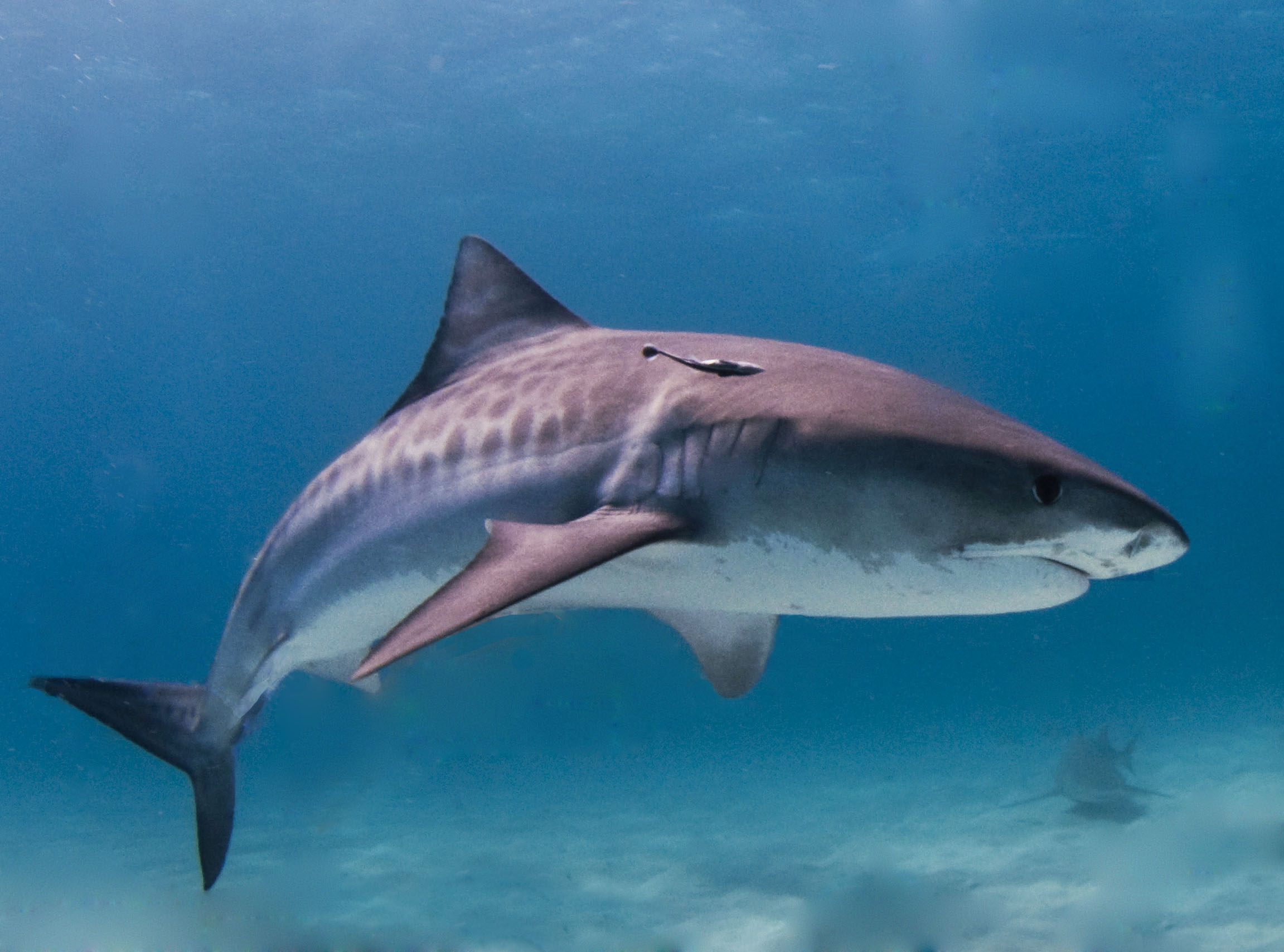
Cartilaginous fishes, like this tiger shark, have placoid scales (dermal denticles)

Shark skin is covered with placoid scales, or dermal denticles; leather made with these scales still attached is referred to as Shagreen. However, Ehrenreich had to find a way to remove these scales from the hides in order for his product to reach a wider market. Initially he tried a process patented by a Danish chemist called Kristian Bendixon. Later the company switched to a system that involved the hides being treated by acid. Two chemists came up with similar ideas, Theodore H. Kohler and Dr Allen Rogers. Once treated in this way the skin could be split into layers, to both increase the yield and obtain the required thickness of leather. The appearance of the resulting hide was similar to that from cattle, but much tougher and less prone to scuffing.

== By-products ==
In addition to a tannery at Tyler Street, Newark, New Jersey, the Ocean Leather Company had reclaiming plants in Morehead City, and Cape Lookout, North Carolina plus Fort Myers and Sanibel Island, Florida. These plants handled sharks, rays, porpoises, turtles and other large sea animals that were landed by its fleet of fishing vessels. The sharks were caught in large mesh nets that trapped the animals. There were other methods used including hooking and underwater explosives, however, it was important to avoid damaging the hide as this reduced its value. There were about twenty other processes to extract by-products from the carcasses including glue, dies, medicine, enzymes, fertilizer, animal feed, oil (from the liver) and the fins that were sold to the Chinese market. The meat could also be dried or smoked and sold as food for human consumption. Ehrenreich took out several of the patents for these processes.

== Expansion and southern oceans ==
In 1922 Ehrenreich travelled to Europe with his wife and two sons for business reasons and to see his family in Austria and Switzerland. In 1923, whilst still in Europe, he applied for a years extension to their passports, informing the American consulate in Vienna that they intended to visit France, Germany, Belgium, Holland, Italy and the British Isles. At this same time Ehrenreich was obtaining patents in Europe in anticipation of moving production outside America. His third child, daughter Ruth, was born in Vienna on 29 April 1923. On the 11 April 1924 in Paris, Ehrenreich was granted a further twelve months extension to his American passport for "Commercial Business" reasons.

Ehrenreich employed fishermen with the expert knowledge for shark hunting and one such was Captain William E. Young (1875–1962) who acted as an operations manager. In about 1923 he joined Ehrenreich's team in Paris and put together an expedition to Djibouti, in French Somaliland, where he helped set up a station for catching and processing sharks. Next he travelled to Australia in 1926 with small team led by Ehrenreich. By this time Young was having doubts about Ehrenreich and his conviction regarding shark migration numbers and routes. They discussed their differing views and eventually agreed to part company. Young remained in Australia for a period but eventually returned to Honolulu, where he set up a business with his brothers.

Ehrenreich travelled to New Zealand to assess the possibility of setting up a shark fishing and processing station there. Nothing came of this so in 1927 he set up a pilot scheme in Carnarvon, Western Australia, leasing a disused meat processing factory from the authorities and calling the operation Marine Products (Australia). At about this same time he and his brother were having a factory ship prepared in Antwerp, Belgium.

== Factory ship ==
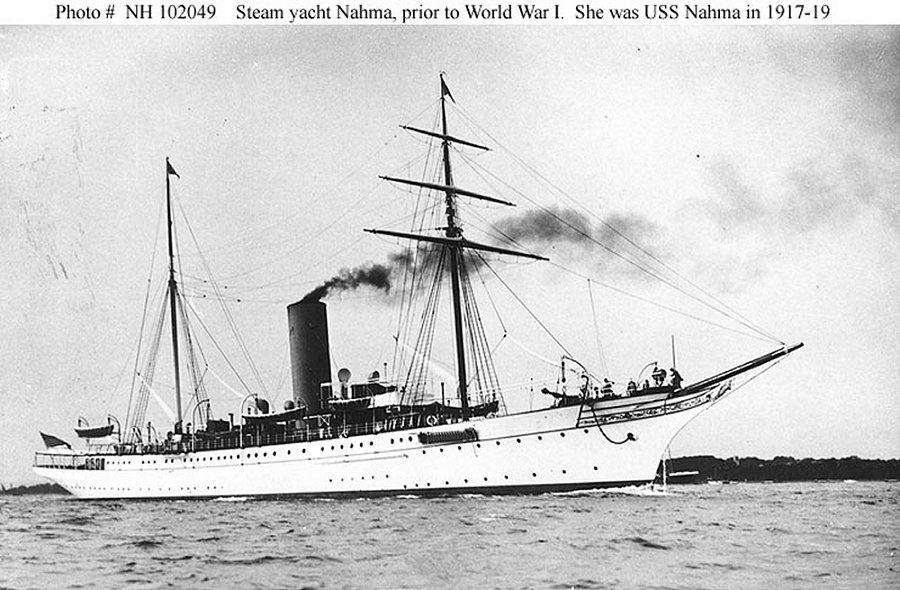
Nahma/Istar

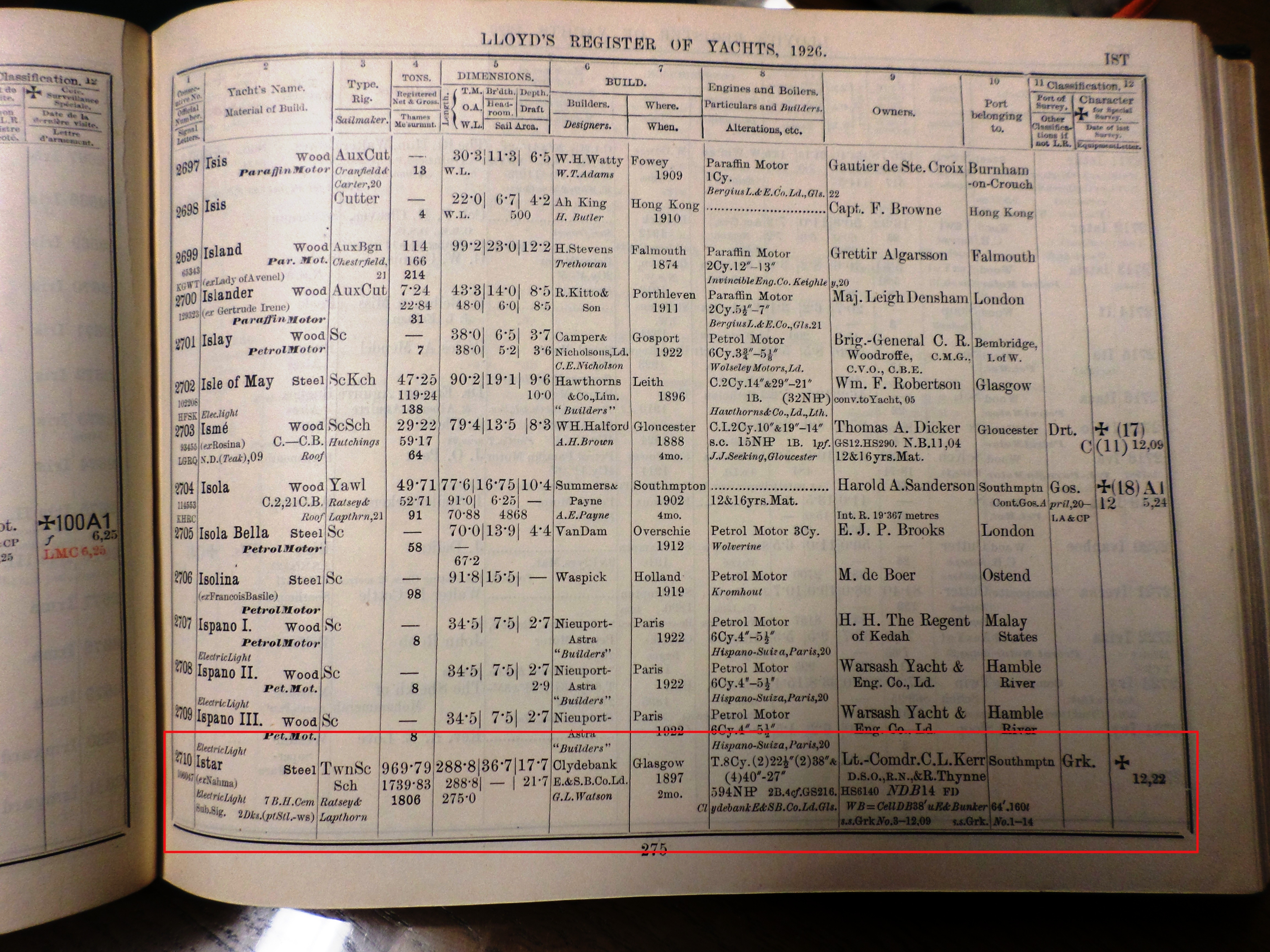
1926 Lloyd's yacht register Istar

The ship chosen for conversion was Istar, a 300 ft luxury yacht, built in 1897 for New York property millionaire Robert Goelet, and originally named Nahma. After Goelet's death the yacht stayed in family hands, but in WWI it was used by the US Navy. During the prohibition years in America it became a rum-runner, after which Prince and Princess Andrew of Russia proposed to take it on a world cruise with paying guests. However, this failed to materialise and the vessel came into the ownership of two Englishmen, ex-Royal Naval Commander Charles Lester Kerr and ex-army Major Robin Thynne, both of whom became directors of Marine Products. They sold the yacht to the company in exchange for 250,000 ordinary shares. Ehrenreich sold his British and Colonial patent rights to the company using this same arrangement. Ehrenreich and Thynne were joint managing directors and Kerr the overseas director. He was with Ehrenreich in New Zealand and Australia in 1927 when the two had a disagreement. Kerr returned to England, where he found it necessary to sue (unsuccessfully) for loss of earnings.

The Istar's conversion to a factory ship was managed by Rudolf Hauschka, who had been with Ehrenreich during the shark fishing pilot scheme in Carnarvon. Care was taken with the design so as not to upset the ship's stability: tanning drums, tanks, and incinerators were erected on the quarterdeck; the oil extraction and drying plant for fins and meat was amidships; the main deck was reserved for the handling of the catch and ten motor boats used for catching the sharks were also accommodated. The Istar could process thirty tons of sharks a per-day with sufficient storage for a hundred days work.

Due to inadequate funding, and resistance from some sectors of the leather trade, Hauschka advised Ehrenreich to abandon his plans. Istar was laid up in the East India Docks, London, for about a year while the company tried to negotiate a solution. Ehrenreich and Hauschka visited Corsica where they were offered land based facilities. The eventual outcome was that Istar was leased to a French syndicate for £200 per month plus a percentage of the profits, and the ship left London for Madagascar in 1929. In about June or July of that year, during bad weather conditions, Istar ran aground and remained so for two to three weeks. The ship was refloated and was taken to Durban, South Africa in a poor condition. The ship had been insured and efforts were made to restart the business in Durban but this failed, leading to bankruptcy proceeding against Marine Products in London. Istar was sold for scrap and scuttled off the coast of Durban on 28 March 1931.

Rudolf Hauschka had left Ehrenreich to work with Dr. Ita Wegman in her clinic in Switzerland. She was a friend of Hauschka and visited him on the Istar when she attended the Anthroposophical World Conference in London 1928. Ehrenreich's fellow director, Major Robin Thynne, became a patient of Dr Wegman before his death in 1936 and it is possible that Ehrenreich also sought treatment in her clinic.

== Final years ==
Ehrenreich and his family had moved to London and lived in a house in Willow Road, overlooking Hampstead Heath. This was just a short walk from the residence of fellow director Robin Thynne. In 1930 Ehrenreich and his wife made frequent trips out of the country due to ill health, and on 16 July 1931 he died of cancer at the Willow Road address.

In 1934 Ehrenreich's widow remarried and lived in the Willow Road house with her new husband, Reginald C. Davey. She and the three children from her marriage to Ehrenreich eventually moved back to America, where she died in 1960 in California.
