= John James Wilson =

British painter (1818–1875)

- Born: 1818; Lambeth, London, England
- Died: 30 January 1875; Folkestone, Kent, England
- Occupation: Painter
- Spouse: Elizabeth (Parker) Wilson
- Parent(s): John H 'Jock' Wilson; Mary Ellen Wilson

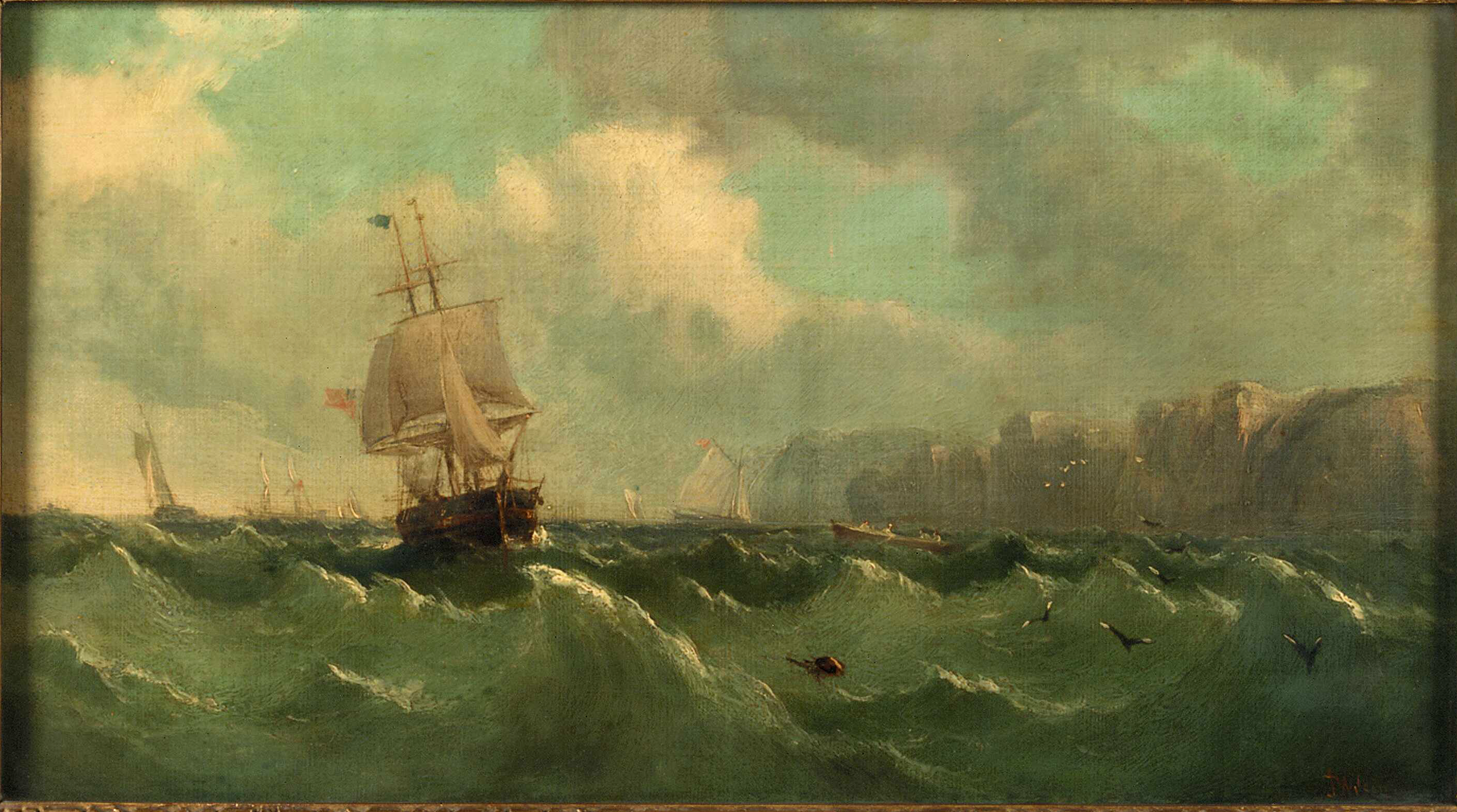
A ship off a high coast, Royal Museums Greenwich

John James Wilson (1818–1875) was the son of John Wilson who was a Scottish landscape and marine painter. The son exhibited similar works to his father's and from the same London address until 1847. Most were landscapes until 1849 and marines thereafter. He moved to Folkestone with his father in 1853. John James Wilson was a prolific artist, exhibiting in excess of six hundred paintings during his working life.

His brother, William Anthony Wilson (1814–1873) was also an artist. He had a son W. J. Wilson (1833–1909) who emigrated to Australia where he became a scene painter, actor and theatre manager.

== Life and family ==
He was born in Lambeth, London in 1818, where he was also baptised in 1833. John James married Elizabeth Parker in 1845 and started his family with the birth (in Bayswater, London) of Elizabeth Parker Wilson in the same year. In the 1851 census, she is listed (age 5) along with Charles (age 1) and the wife's sister Josephine Parker (age 22). The address is recorded as 13 Park Place, Milton, near Gravesend, Kent. At this time John James' wife is recorded as visiting, with 3-year-old daughter Mary, the home (in Reigate, Surrey) of Charles Davidson, his wife Ann and family,

By the 1861 census, the family was living at 3 West Terrace Folkestone, Kent, and circumstances had significantly moved on. John James' children are listed as Mary B (age 13, born Redhill, Surrey), Charles J (age 11, born Redhill, Surrey), Robert B (age 9, born Leicester, Leicestershire), John M (age 7, born Gravesend, Kent), William (age 6, born Folkestone), Frank (age 5, born Folkestone), Amy (age 3, born Folkestone), Vernon (age 5 months, born Folkestone). There is no mention of the 15-year-old daughter Elizabeth. Josephine Parker is recorded as 'Sister in law' and 'Fundholder'.

By the 1871 census, Sidney, Ada (future mother of the submariner Commander Charles Lester Kerr) and Minnie (aged 7,6 and 4 respectively) had also been born. John and Vernon were no longer listed. The latter having died later in 1861. Josephine Parker (age 42), the unmarried sister-in-law, is still mentioned as living with the family. The address at the time is given as Belle Vue House, Folkestone

== Career ==
John James Wilson exhibited at the Royal Academy of Arts (55 paintings), the British Institution (57 paintings), Royal Society of British Artists (384 paintings), the Royal Scottish Academy (106 paintings) Royal Glasgow Institute of the Fine Arts (3 paintings), and the Royal Hibernian Academy (14 paintings).

He exhibited his first painting (Cottages near Southampton) at the British Institution in 1834. In 1875, the year of his death, three paintings (The old 'Star' Newington, Kent; On the coast, Etretat, Normandy; Trawler going out-Normandy) were exhibited at the Royal Society of British Artists (RBA) priced at £35, £30 and £50 respectively. These paintings were submitted by his widow. At the age of around 28, the quality of John James Wilson's work was recognised when he was elected a member of the RBA in 1845.

During John Jame's long period in Folkestone his achievements and aspects of his career were mentioned in the local press. At the 1863 Art Union of Great Britain exhibition in Manchester his second-prize painting Tantallon Castle was valued at £80. At the 1865 exhibition his second-prize painting Fishing Luggers off Boulogne Harbour was valued at £120. Also in 1865, at the fifth annual rifle contest between members of the Cinque Ports Rifle Volunteers, one of the prizes was 'an oil painting, valued at £15, presented by JJ Wilson, Esq. the well known marine artist.' In 1869, at the Folkestone Art Union, eight of his paintings were exhibited and offered as prizes. The first-prize painting was At Fecamp, a Normandy fishing village valued at 100 guineas (equivalent to around £13,000 in 2020 money).' In April 1873 John James Wilson was commissioned to paint a picture of Folkestone as a testimonial for the local Member of Parliament Baron Mayer de Rothschild in acknowledgement of the interest he had taken in the town. It is not known if the painting was ever completed or presented as the Baron died on 6 February 1874.

Many of his seascapes featured locations around the English Channel. These and his other paintings are still popular and are sold at auction rooms around the UK and elsewhere. Examples of the prices for some of his larger marine paintings are as follows. 'Fishing Vessels off the Isle of Wight', £7200, 24x43in (Sotheby's, London, 29 March 2003); 'Watching for the return of the fishing fleet, Calais', £3000, 24x36in (Christie's, London, 7 June 2017). And the speculatively titled 'The approaching storm, South Coast possibly off Folkestone', £5434, 24x37in (Lyndsay Burns, Perth, Scotland; 14 December 2010); The correct location for this latter painting was given when it (lot 80) was sold at Sotheby's Belgravia on 8 April 1975 for a hammer price of £750. The illustrated lot on page 15 of the catalogue (Victorian Paintings, Drawings and Watercolours) was titled 'Fecamp Head, Normandy'. Further information on the provenance of the painting can be found in the records compiled by the National Portrait Gallery, London.

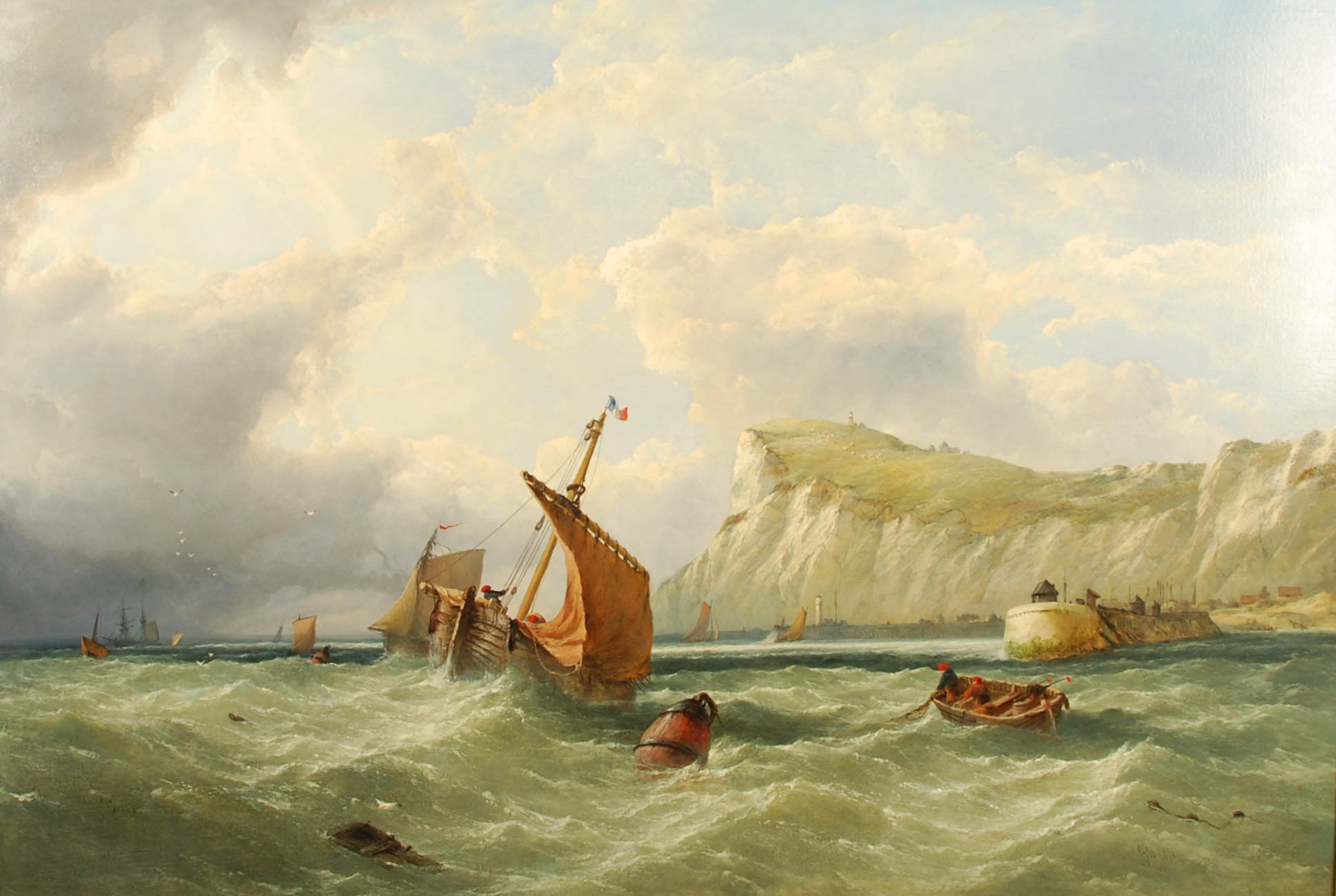
Fecamp Head, Normandy. Oil on canvas, signed with initials and dated 1871.

== Death ==
John James Wilson died aged 57 on 30 January 1875. Initially, it seems unclear where he died. The Free BMD records seem to indicate that his father (year of death 1855), John James, as well as his son Vernon (year of death 1861) all died in the small village of Elham, Kent. Elham is approximately 5 miles (8 km) north west of Folkestone and 9 miles (14 km) south of Canterbury. The anomaly is resolved, however, as Elham was named as the registration district that historically included other parishes such as Folkestone. More specifically, the burial record indicates that John James died in 'Bayle Folkestone'. 'The Bayle' is an area of central Folkestone. The death notice in the local newspaper (Whitstable Times and Herne Bay Herald) indicated that he died on 30 January 1875 aged 57. He was buried at Cheriton Road Cemetery, Folkestone on 6 February 1875. The death certificate gives further information. It shows that John James Wilson died at home in Belle Vue House and that the cause of death was given as 'Diseased Liver (Cirrhosis)'.

When John James's wife Elizabeth died aged 73 in 1901, she was buried along with her husband and their son Vernon, and her name included on the gravestone. Under John James Wilson's name there is the following inscription, 'FOR 30 YEARS A MEMBER OF THE INCORPORATED SOCIETY OF BRITISH ARTISTS' (which became the RBA). The gravestone was located by the Friends of the old Folkestone cemetery.

== Postscript ==
The ArtUK web site lists 18 of John James Wilson's oil paintings at public museums and galleries throughout the United Kingdom. In 1926 the Folkestone town council purchased his painting ‘’Blowing Fresh, Etretat, Normandy’’, which was exhibited at the Royal Academy in 1865, for 35 guineas from a local art dealer. It is currently displayed in the mayor's parlour.

In 1966 the Folkestone museum art collection benefitted from a bequest (via the widow, Dorothea Blanchard Kerr) from John James's grandson Charles Lester Kerr. This comprised two paintings by John James Wilson and one by his father John Wilson .
