= Hartwell baronets =

Baronetcy in the Baronetage of the United Kingdom

- Creation date: 1805
- Created by: George III
- Peerage: Peerage of the United Kingdom
- Status: extant
- Motto: Sorte sua contentus, Content with his lot

The Hartwell Baronetcy, of Dale Hall in the County of Essex, is a title in the Baronetage of the United Kingdom. It was created on 26 October 1805 for Admiral Francis Hartwell.

== Hartwell baronets, of Dale Hall (1805) ==
- Sir Francis John Hartwell, 1st Baronet (1757–1831)
- Sir Brodrick Hartwell, 2nd Baronet (1813–1888)
- Sir Francis Houlton Hartwell, 3rd Baronet (1835–1900)
- Sir Brodrick Cecil Denham Arkwright Hartwell, 4th Baronet (1876–1948)
- Sir Brodrick William Charles Elwin Hartwell, 5th Baronet (1909–1993)
- Sir (Francis) Anthony Charles Peter Hartwell, 6th Baronet (1940–2023)
- Sir Timothy Peter Michael Charles Hartwell, 7th Baronet (born 1970)

The heir apparent to the baronetcy is Samuel Michael Henry Hartwell (born 2006), only son of the 7th Baronet.

== Extended family ==
John Redmond Hartwell (1887–1970), son of Sydney Charles Elphinstone Hartwell, third son of the second Baronet, was a major general in the army.

== Notes ==
Baronetage of the United Kingdom
Preceded by Burroughs baronets	Hartwell baronets of Dale Hall; 26 October 1805	Succeeded by Wigram baronets
