= Anthony Hartwell =

Sir Anthony Hartwell 6th Baronet
- Born: 1 June 1940
- Died: 27 February 2023 (aged 82)
- Education: Bedford Modern School
- Known for: Master mariner 6th Baronet Hartwell of Dale Hall, Essex

Sir Francis Anthony Charles Peter Hartwell, 6th Baronet (1 June 1940 – 27 February 2023) was a British master mariner, marine surveyor, nautical consultant and, from 1993, 6th Baronet Hartwell of Dale Hall, Essex.

== Early life ==
Hartwell was the son of Sir Brodrick William Charles Elwin Hartwell, 5th Baronet, and his first wife, Marie Josephine Hartwell. He was educated at Bedford Modern School, the Thames Nautical Training College and HMS Worcester.

== Career ==
Hartwell started his career as a cadet in the Royal Navy Reserve aboard the Thames Nautical Training College, HMS Worcester 1955–57. He went to sea as an apprentice with P&O Group. He became a master mariner in 1972, assistant nautical inspector and cargo superintendent (Overseas Containers Limited) at the P&O Group (1958–71). Thereafter, he was chief officer of North Sea operations at Ocean Inchcape Limited (1972–73) before engaging in overseas port management in Nigeria, Papua New Guinea and Saudi Arabia (1975–87).

Subsequently, Hartwell was a marine consultant, a director of International Diamond Drilling in West Africa (from 1999) and also conducted survey and inspection assignments in oil, gas and shipping services in Lagos, Nigeria (from 2000).

== Personal life and death ==
Hartwell married Barbara Phyllis Rae in 1968. The marriage was dissolved in 1989. They had one son, Timothy Peter Michael Charles Hartwell (born 8 July 1970), heir to the Hartwell Baronetcy.

Hartwell died on 27 February 2023, at the age of 82.

Baronetage of the United Kingdom
Preceded by Sir Brodrick Hartwell, 5th Baronet	Baronet (of Dale Hall in the County of Essex); 1993-2023	Succeeded by Timothy Peter Michael Charles Hartwell
