= HMS A8 =

Submarine of the Royal Navy

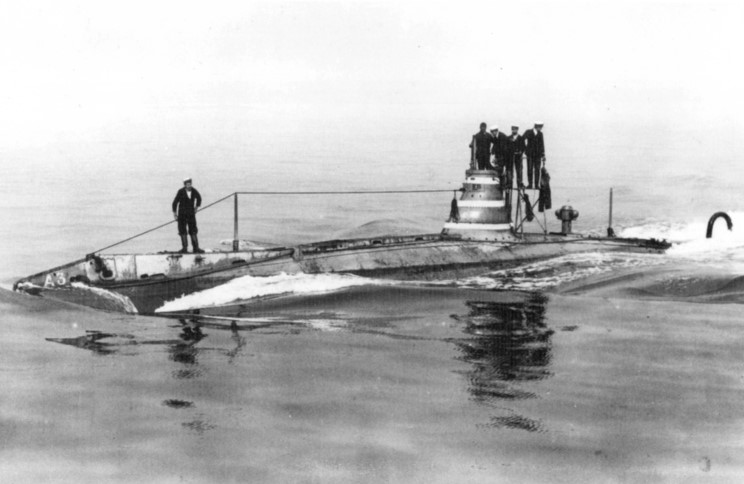
- The sister ship HMS A3

History

United Kingdom
- Builder: Vickers, Sons & Maxim Ltd.; Barrow-in-Furness
- Laid down: 1 September 1903
- Launched: 23 January 1905
- Commissioned: 8 May 1905
- Fate: Sold on 8 October 1920 for scrap

General characteristics
- Class & type: A class submarine
- Displacement: 190 tons surfaced, 207 tons submerged
- Length: 32 m (105 ft)
- Beam: 3.3 m (11 ft)
- Draught: 3.2 m (10 ft)
- Propulsion: 550 hp (410 kW) Wolseley 18-cylinder petrol engine; 150 hp (110 kW) electric motor and shaft
- Speed: 11 kn (20 km/h; 13 mph) maximum surfaced; 8 kn (15 km/h; 9.2 mph) maximum submerged
- Range: 325 nmi (602 km; 374 mi) at 11 kn (20 km/h; 13 mph) surfaced; 20 nmi (37 km; 23 mi) at 6 kn (11 km/h; 6.9 mph) submerged
- Complement: 11 (2 officers and 9 ratings)
- Armament: Two 18 inch torpedo tubes

HMS A8 was an early Royal Navy submarine. She was a member of Group Two of the 1903 British A-class of submarines. Like the other members of her class, she was built at Vickers, Sons & Maxim in Barrow-in-Furness.

She sank with the loss of 15 crew as a result of an accident in Plymouth Sound on 8 June 1905. A sudden dip in the bow caused the submarine to be swamped through the hatch in the conning tower. Only 4 survived. She was salvaged four days after the accident, at which point a loose rivet was found in the bow plating. The submarine was then repaired, recommissioned and used for training during the First World War along with A9 as part of the First Submarine Flotilla, operating near Devonport through early 1916. She was sold on 8 October 1920 to a scrapping company in Dartmouth.

== Design ==
The A-class submarines had a displacement of 190 tons surfaced, and 205–207 tons submerged. They had a length of 32 metres (105 ft), a beam of 3.9 metres (13 ft), and a draught of 3.3 metres (11 ft). A8 was powered by one Wolseley 16-cylinder petrol engine, one shaft and one electric motor. The engine produced 550 hp (410 kW), and the electric systems produced 150 hp (110 kW). A8 had a speed of 11 knots (20 km/h; 13 mph) surfaced, and 6 knots (11 km/h; 6.9 mph) submerged. A8 had a range of 320 nmi (590 km; 370 mi) at a speed of 10 knots (19 km/h; 12 mph) when surfaced. A8 had two torpedo tubes on the bow which carried a total of four 18-inch torpedoes. The ship had a crew strength of 11 total officers and sailors.

== Construction and service ==
The ship was launched by Vickers on 23 January 1905.

=== Sinking ===
A8 sank off Plymouth Sound on 8 June 1905. 15 crew members died when the units onboard were being changed. It seemed like the submarine had suddenly dived. As per The Times, A8 and A7 had departed from HMNB Devonport for diving exercises. After completing two dives, the submarine surfaced as three members of the crew would be replaced by three trainees. When the three crew members had come out, the bow started dropping, sending a lot of water into the conning tower. The submarine then began diving before the hatch could be closed. The sailors on the conning tower jumped into the water as the submarine sank. HMS Commonwealth and HMS Forth lowered their boats, but only four survivors could be found. Among the survivors were Lieutenant Algernon Henry Chester Candy (later Rear Admiral), and Petty Officer William Waller.

The ship was resurfaced after four days. A loose rivet on the bow plating was found to be the cause of the sinking. Even though it was a minor error, it resulted in one ton of water entering the submarine every ten minutes. The battery bursts were thought to be the cause initially, but they were actually the effect. The batteries probably burst because the fuel vapour burnt, when the water short-circuited the electrical equipment onboard after the submarine had sunk.

The ship was sold for scrap on 8 October 1920, to the Dartmouth firm Philip.

== Legacy ==
A memorial to the 46 sailors sunk aboard A1, A3, A5 and A8 is present at Haslar in Gosport, Hampshire. The Resurgam plaque, located in front of the HMS Alliance at the Royal Navy Submarine Museum lists all the ships lost from 1905 to 1955, including the above ships.

== Bibliography ==
- Colledge, J. J.; Warlow, Ben & Bush, Steve (2020). Ships of the Royal Navy: The Complete Record of all Fighting Ships of the Royal Navy from the 15th Century to the Present (5th revised and updated ed.). Seaforth Publishing. ISBN 978-1-5267-9327-0.
- Gray, Edwyn (2003). Disasters of the Deep: A Comprehensive Survey of Submarine Accidents & Disasters. Pen & Sword. ISBN 9781473813656.
- Hepper, David (2006). British Warship Losses in the Ironclad Era, 1860–1919. Chatham Publishing. ISBN 978-1-861762-73-3.
- Kemp, Paul (1990). British Submarines Of World War One. Arms & Armour Press. ISBN 9781854090102.
- McCartney, Innes (2002). Lost Patrols: Submarine Wrecks of the English Channel. Periscope Publishing. ISBN 9781904381044.
