= USS Nahma (SP-771) =

Patrol vessel of the United States Navy

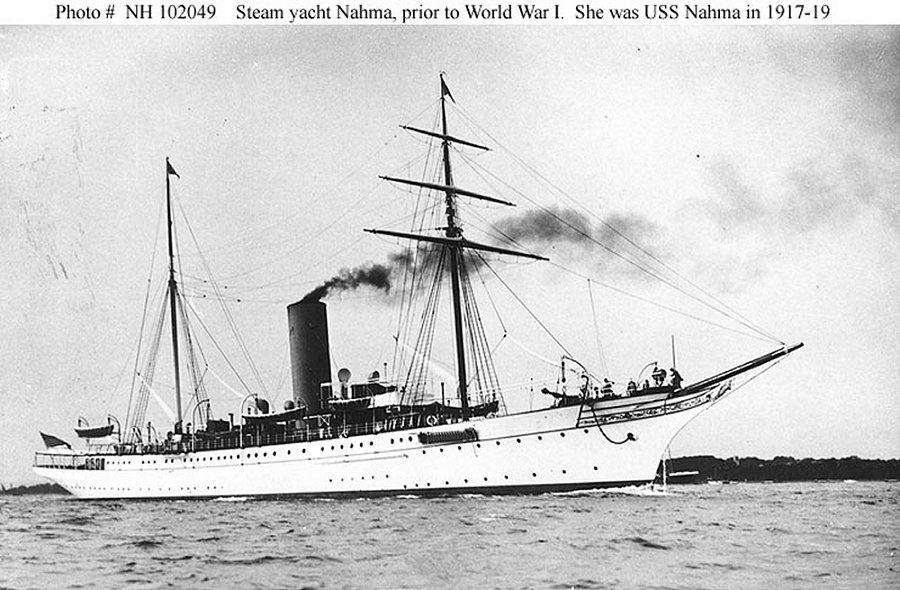
- Nahma as a private yacht prior to World War I.

History

United States
- Name: Nahma
- Owner: Robert Goelet; Robert Walton Goelet
- Builder: Clydebank Engine and Shipbuilding Company, Glasgow, Scotland
- Launched: 14 February 1897
- In service: 1897–1917; 1919–1923
- Fate: Leased to U.S. Navy 21 June 1917; Returned by U.S. Navy 19 July 1919; Sold 1923

United States NavyUnited States
- Name: USS Nahma
- Namesake: Previous name retained
- Acquired: 21 June 1917
- Commissioned: 27 August 1917
- Decommissioned: 19 July 1919
- Fate: Returned to owner 19 July 1919

United Kingdom
- Name: Istar
- Owner: Jeremiah Brown & Co. (1923); George Ernest Millner (1923–1925); C. L. Kerr and Robin Thynne (1925–1927); Marine Products (1927–1931)
- Fate: Sold for scrap March 1931; Scuttled 28 March 1931

General characteristics (as U.S. Navy patrol vessel)
- Displacement: 2,900 long tons (2,947 t)
- Length: 319 ft (97 m)
- Beam: 36 ft 6 in (11.13 m)
- Draft: 18 ft 6 in (5.64 m)
- Speed: 12 knots (22 km/h; 14 mph)
- Complement: 162
- Armament: 2 × 5 in (130 mm) guns; 2 × 3 in (76 mm) guns; 2 × machine guns

USS Nahma (SP-771) was a United States Navy patrol vessel in commission from 1917 to 1919. She operated during and in the immediate aftermath of World War I, seeing service in the Atlantic Ocean, Mediterranean Sea, Aegean Sea, and Black Sea. Prior to her U.S. Navy service, she was the private yacht Nahma, a sister ship of the yacht which became the U.S. Navy patrol vessel and presidential yacht USS Mayflower.

After her U.S. Navy service, Nahma returned to private ownership. Renamed Istar, she operated as a rum runner and later as a fish factory ship.

== Construction and early career ==
Nahma was built by the Clydebank Engineering & Shipbuilding Company in Glasgow, Scotland, in 1897 as a private luxury steam yacht for Robert Goelet. She was launched on 14 February 1897.

Nahma was the sister ship of the yacht Mayflower, built at the same time on the River Clyde for Ogden Goelet, brother of Robert Goelet. Mayflower went on to become USS Mayflower, a U.S. Navy patrol vessel and presidential yacht.

== United States Navy ==
The United States Navy acquired Nahma on a free lease from Robert Goelet's son, Robert Walton Goelet, on 21 June 1917 for use during World War I as a section patrol vessel. She was commissioned into U.S. Navy service on 27 August 1917 as USS Nahma (SP-771).

Soon after fitting out and shakedown by the Navy Nahma reported to Gibraltar to join a group of U.S. Navy vessels based there and serving as convoy escorts. With these ships, she escorted Allied vessels in the Mediterranean Sea, as well as in the Atlantic Ocean between the United Kingdom and Gibraltar.

On 6 October 1917, Nahma was involved in a series of friendly fire incidents. At 19:00 on 5 October, she was on patrol in the Atlantic Ocean west of Gibraltar when she received a radio report of an Imperial German Navy submarine in the vicinity and proceeded toward its reported position. At 02:00 on 6 October she sighted a flash ahead which resembled the flash of a gun. At 02:30 she sighted the Italian cargo ship SS Bologna, followed by two submarines. Bologna was on a voyage from Bermuda to Gibraltar as part of a convoy that was running five days behind schedule, and the submarines were the Regia Marina (Italian Royal Navy) submarines H6 and H8, two of the three submarines serving as escorts for the convoy. The third escorting submarine had become separated from the convoy in fog after the reported sighting of a German submarine.

Having earlier received a report of enemy submarine activity in the area and seen what appeared to be a flash of gunfire, Nahma′s crew assumed that H6 and H8 were German submarines attacking Bologna. She opened gunfire, firing two rounds at the leading submarine, H8, neither of which hit, and made a recognition signal challenge. When H8 did not respond, she fired two more rounds, then ceased fire when H8 responded correctly to the challenge. Nahma then approached H6 and observed members of H6′s crew running aft along her deck. They were going to hoist the Italian colors, but Nahma assumed they were going to man H6′s deck gun and fired one round. It hit H6′s conning tower, killing two men and wounding seven others, two of whom later died of their wounds. Nahma then identified H6 as friendly, ceased fire, and stood by to assist H6 for the remainder of the night.

At about 05:00 on 6 October 1917, the British torpedo boat HMS TB 93 arrived on the scene and accidentally fired one round toward Nahma. It missed, and Nahma headed toward the flash. At 05:20 she sighted TB 93 and mistook her for a German submarine. She opened gunfire, firing two rounds at TB 93 before identifying her as friendly. On the morning of 6 October, Nahma escorted H6 and H8 to Gibraltar.

Nahma continued her escort duties through the armistice with Germany, which brought World War I to an end on 11 November 1918. Following the war, she remained in the Mediterranean for relief and quasi-diplomatic work. Operating in the Aegean Sea and Black Sea, she carried relief supplies to refugee areas; evacuated American nationals, non-combatants, the sick, and the wounded from areas of Russia and Turkey affected by the Russian Civil War and the Turkish War of Independence; and provided communications services between ports. She was decommissioned at Greenock, Scotland, on 19 July 1919 and returned to Robert Walton Goelet.

== Later career ==
In 1923, Goelet sold Nahma to Jeremiah Brown and Company, which renamed her Istar and registered her under the British flag. Later in 1923, British Army Lieutenant Colonel George Ernest Millner, DSO, OBE, MC, acquired her. During the years of Prohibition in the United States, she became part of the illicit rum running fleet off the Virginia Capes, smuggling Scotch whisky into the United States on behalf of Sir Brodrick Hartwell from 1923 to 1925.

In 1925, Istar was sold to Royal Navy Commander C. L. Kerr, DSO, and Robin Thynne of Southampton, England. In 1927, she again was sold, to Alfred Ehrenreich of Marine Products in Southampton, who converted her for use as a shark-processing factory ship.

By March 1931, Istar had been laid up at Port Natal, South Africa, and she was sold for scrap that month. Rather being scrapped, however, she was scuttled in the Indian Ocean 7 kilometres (3.8 nmi; 4.3 mi) outside the harbour at Durban, South Africa, on 28 March 1931.
