= Brodrick C. D. A. Hartwell =

Sir Brodrick Cecil Denham Arkwright Hartwell, 4th Baronet (10 July 1876 – 24 November 1948), was a British Army officer who served during the Second Boer War and World War I. In the 1920s he operated a much publicised off-shore business exporting alcoholic spirits to the United States during prohibition.

== Background ==
Born near Kingston, Somerset, Hartwell was the only son of Royal Naval officer Edward Hughes Brodrick Hartwell, who in 1878 became the inspector-general of police in Jamaica and was later the British Consul in Naples, Italy, and Augusta Henrietta, daughter of police magistrate Stewart Henry Paget, grandson of Henry Paget, 1st Earl of Uxbridge and John Fane, 10th Earl of Westmorland. Augusta's mother, Charlotte, was daughter of the politician Sir Robert Williams, 9th Baronet. Hartwell’s mother died in Jamaica in 1883 and his father died in 1895 having remarried in 1885 to Ella (Isabella) Miller. Hartwell became the 4th Baronet in September 1900 when his uncle, Sir Francis Houlton Hartwell, 3rd Bt., died.

== Army career ==
At the outbreak of the Boer War, Hartwell was involved with tea planting in Ceylon (now Sri Lanka). He became a non-commissioned officer with the rank of lance corporal in the Ceylon Mounted Infantry and his contingent was sent to South Africa where they joined Lord Roberts during his advance on Bloemfontein. Records indicate that Hartwell was awarded the Queen's South Africa Medal with clasp for campaign at Driefontein (10 March 1900) and the Cape Colony clasp. In August 1900 The London Gazette published the transfer of Lance - Corporal Brodrick Cecil Denham Arkwright Hartwell, from Ceylon Mounted Infantry, to The Leicestershire Regiment, Supernumerary to the establishment. He was promoted to lieutenant on 26 April 1902, shortly before the end of the war in South Africa. In 1906 Lieutenant Hartwell resigned his commission with The Leicestershire Regiment.

During WWI, Hartwell was on the military General List and was assigned first to the Leicestershire Regiment as temporary captain, then to the Northumberland Fusiliers as temporary major. He saw service in the Gallipoli Campaign and later became a Lieutenant-Colonel with the 1st Garrison Battalion, Oxfordshire and Buckinghamshire Light Infantry assigned to the British Convalescent Section, Dagshai, India. He was stationed there with his family; his daughter, Kathleen Edith Doreen Augusta (Hartwell) Hicks-Beach, was born there in June 1918.

== Marriage and divorce ==
In 1902, Hartwell married Georgette Madeleine, daughter of George Pilon-Fleury of Algiers, and they had one child, daughter Leila Ruth Madeleine Hartwell. The couple divorced in 1907 and the circumstances were made public in newspaper reports in many countries round the world.

Hartwell had eloped to Australia with Mrs Joan Amy (Jeffrey) Chamberlain in 1906; she was the wife of Royal Navy engineering officer Edgar Warner Chamberlain. Whilst in Australia the couple, acting as husband and wife, fitted out a schooner and went hunting for salvage in the sunken liner Ramsay lost on the Elizabeth Reef or Middleton Reef. During the voyage they rescued the stranded crew of the barque Annasona and took them to Norfolk Island. Divorce proceedings against the couple took place in England and letters were produced in court from them both admitting their guilt. Hartwell and Mrs Chamberlain, who was Scottish born but grew up in Canada, eventually married and had two children, one of whom, Brodrick William Charles Elwin Hartwell, became the 5th Bart. There was also a child from the marriage of Edgar and Joan Chamberlain - Phoebe Joan Mary Jeffrey Chamberlain - who, in the 1911 census, was living with the Hartwells. Edgar Warner Chamberlain became a member of the crew of HMS Bulwark and was killed in November 1914 when the ship exploded with the loss of 736 men.

== "Rum-running" and bankruptcy ==
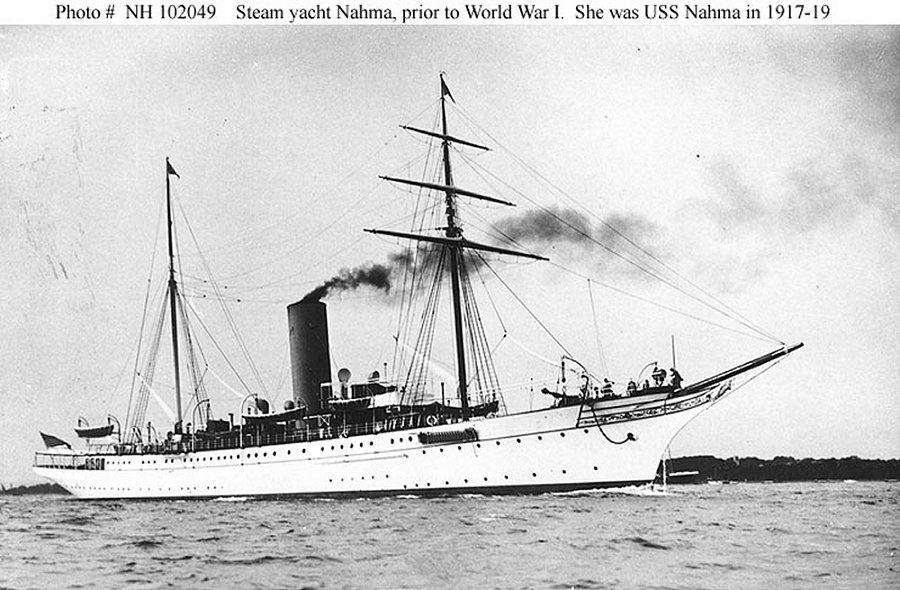
Nahma, later Istar

Hartwell became involved with various business enterprises after his return from Australia. He was director of companies that included Atlantic Oil and Rubber Trust Ltd., Gold Coast Rubber and Mahogany Estates Ltd., and chairman of Consolidated Oil Fields of South Africa Ltd. and the Premier Motor Bus Company Ltd. However, by 1913 he was declared bankrupt blaming outstanding remunerations and the disappearance of a colleague who was a fund holder. In a 1915 court case relating to failed national sweepstakes, his name was linked with that of Horatio Bottomley, publisher of the magazine John Bull who was later jailed for fraud. Hartwell was not able to attend the hearing as he was with the British Army in the Dardanelles.

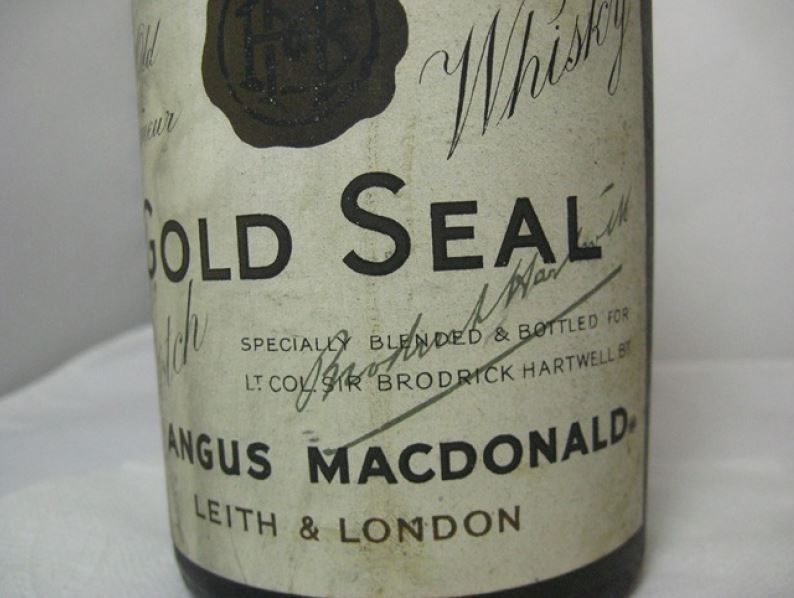
Sir Brodrick Hartwell's personalised whisky label

In 1923, Hartwell sent out circulars offering a return of 20% for a 60-day investment in off-shore whisky sales. This referred to the illicit sale of alcohol to the USA during the Prohibition Years. The scheme involved Hartwell buying consignments of whisky and transporting these across the Atlantic where they were to be sold off-shore to dealers who operated from smaller boats. Hartwell used the ocean going steam yacht Istar, formerly named Nahma, a luxury 300ft vessel originally built for the New York property millionaire, Robert Walton Goelet and used by the US Navy during WW1. Later under examination Hartwell said that he had made seven voyages, but the last one was a total loss, the cargo having been partly confiscated by prohibition officers and some taken by bootleggers who had not paid. In consequence, Hartwell was again bankrupt, to the extent of £250,000.

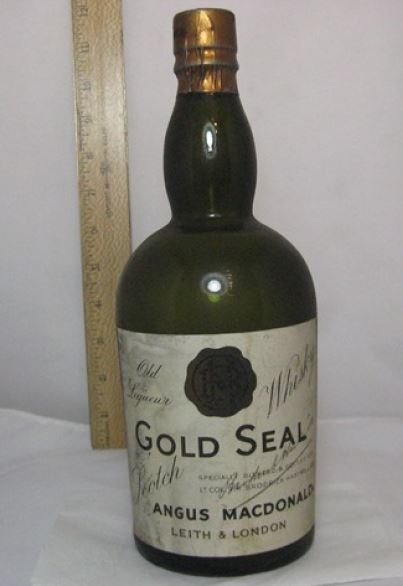
Bottle of Sir Brodrick Hartwell's whisky sold to USA bootleggers during prohibition years

Hartwell had been very open about his business, giving newspaper interviews and even having a personalised label put on the whisky bottles. This publicity came to the attention of some members of the British Parliament who raised the matter with the then Prime Minister, Ramsay MacDonald, who described Hartwell's operation as a "disgraceful blot". One irony was that the sister ship of the whisky smuggling yacht Istar was the US Presidential Yacht Mayflower, having been built at the same time and the same yard for Robert Goelet's brother Ogden.

The yacht Istar was not register with Hartwell at Lloyd's, but with Lt. Col. George Ernest Millner (1884-1949), an ex-soldier who had fought almost continuously in France from 1914 to 1918. He was awarded the Military Cross and Distinguished Service Order plus some years later, the Order of the British Empire.

Hartwell died in his London home on 24 November 1948. His wife, Joan, Lady Hartwell, died on 12 May 1962.

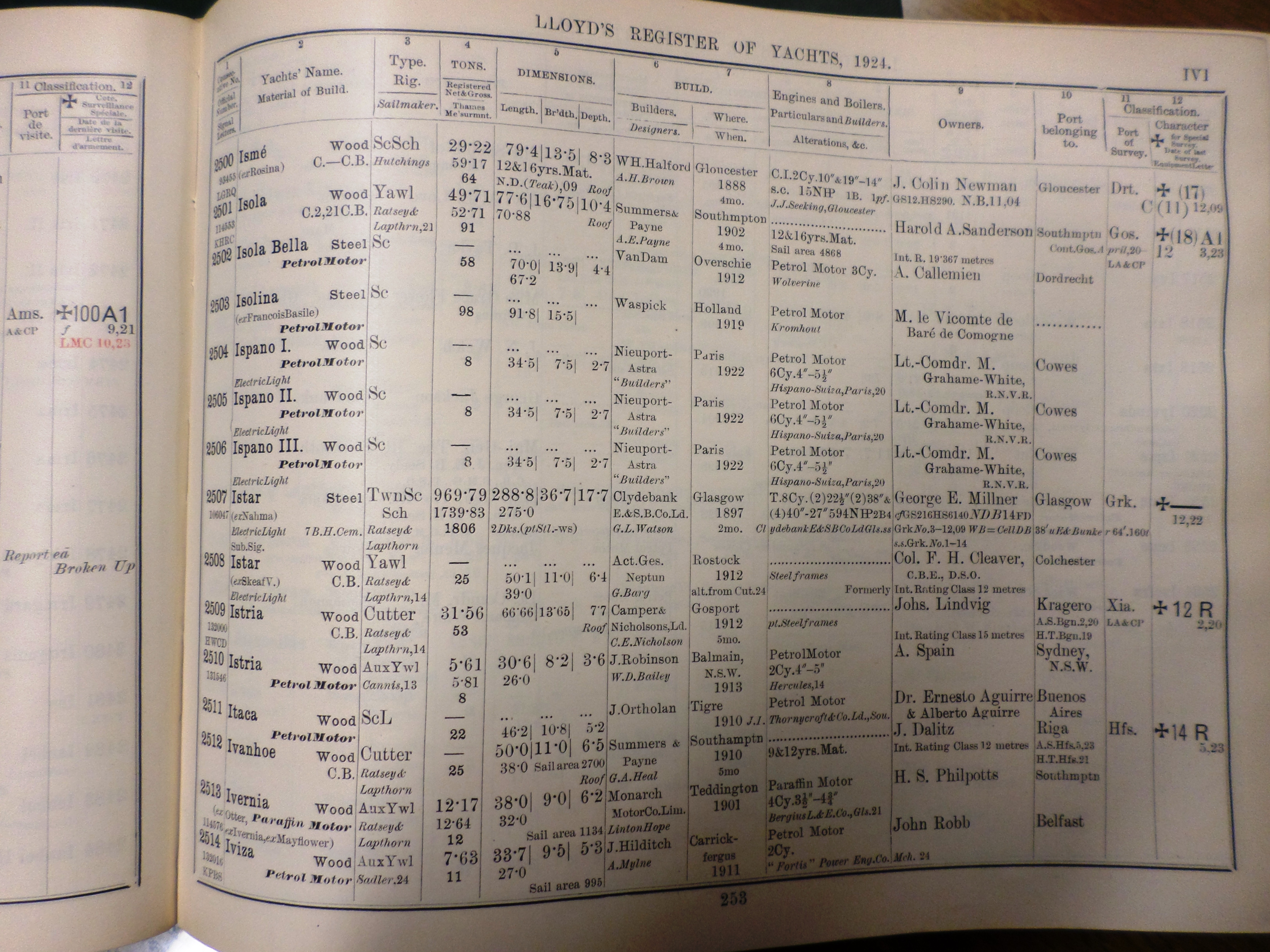
Lloyd's yacht register 1924 - Istar owner George E. Millner

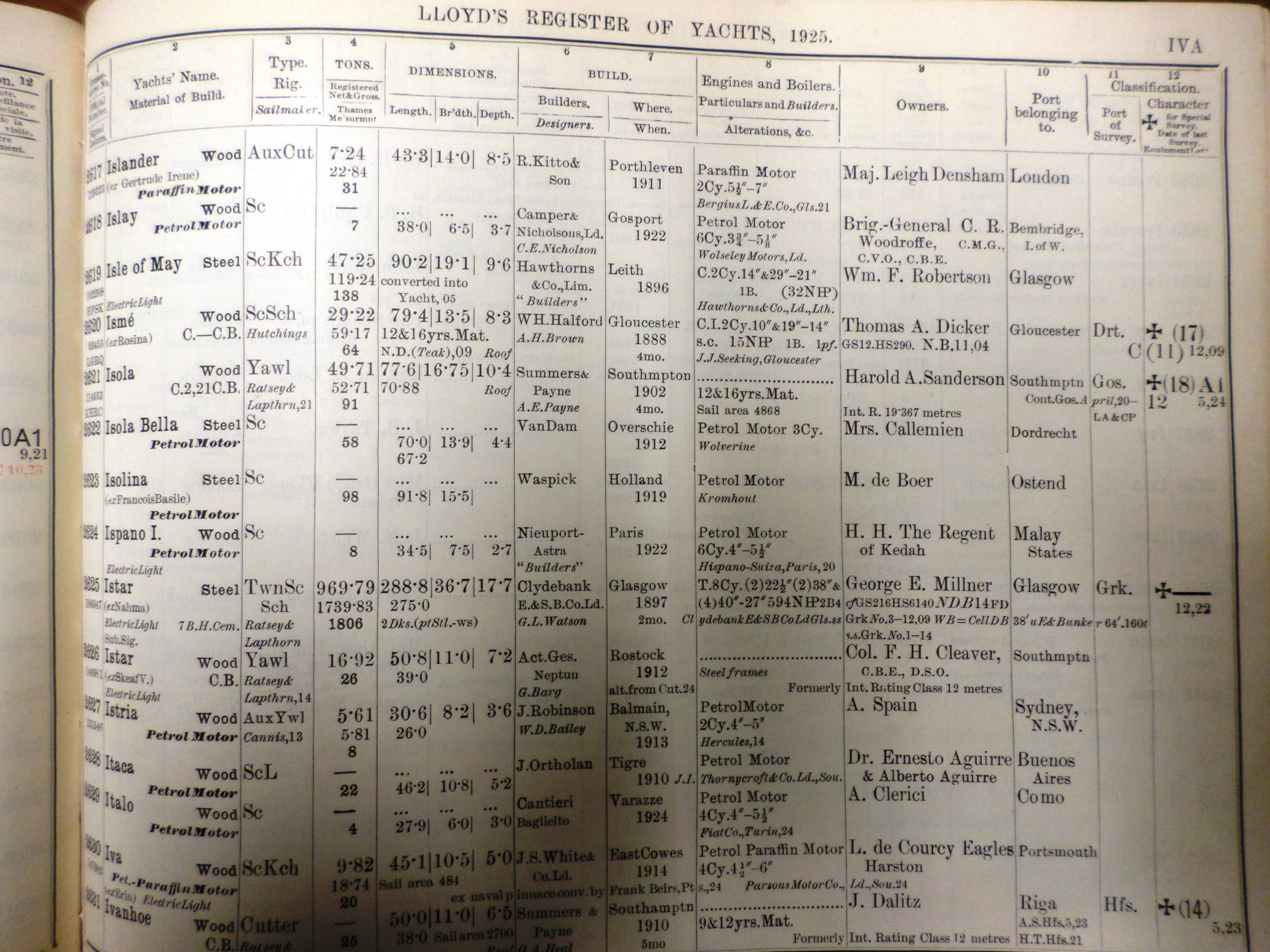
Lloyd's yacht register 1925 - Istar owner George E. Millner

Baronetage of the United Kingdom
| Preceded by Francis Hartwell | Baronet (of Dale Hall); 1900–1948 | Succeeded by Brodrick Hartwell |
