= John Wilson (painter, born 1774) =

Scottish landscape and marine painter (1774–1855)

- Born: John Hasell Wilson; 20 August 1774; Ayr, Scotland
- Died: 29 April 1855 (aged 80); Folkestone, England
- Elected: President, Royal Society of British Artists

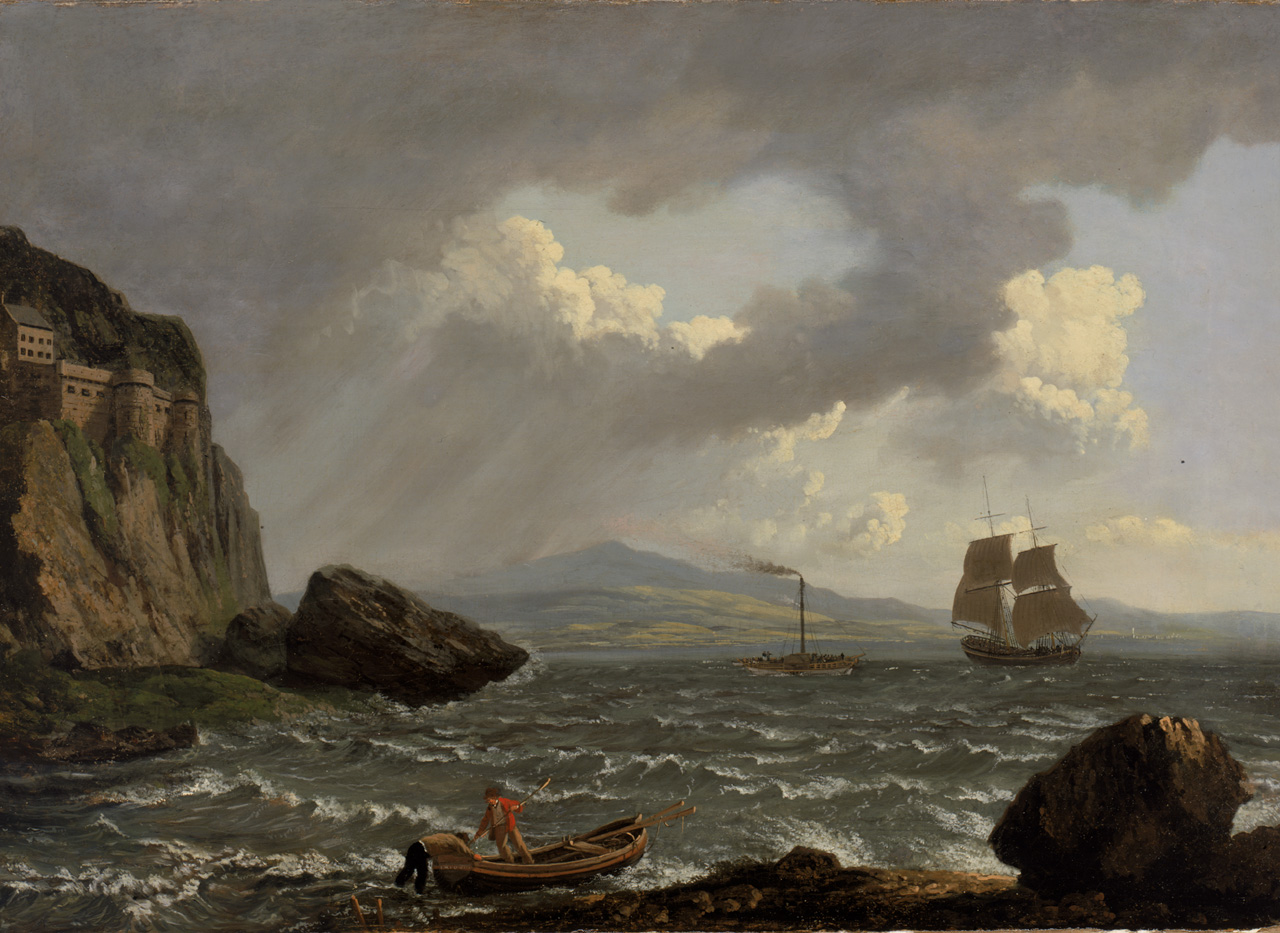
Painting of the paddle steamer Dumbarton Castle, by John Wilson

John 'Old Jock' Wilson RBA (1774 in Ayr – 1855 in Folkestone) was a Scottish landscape and marine painter, president of the Society of British Artists in 1827.

Wilson was apprenticed at age thirteen to a decorator named John Norrie in Edinburgh and then received instruction in landscape painting from Alexander Nasmyth. For about two years Wilson lived in Montrose, where he painted landscapes and taught drawing. In 1798, he moved to London, where he painted scenery for Astley's Amphitheatre and one or two other theatres. Between 1807 and 1855, he exhibited 76 paintings at the Royal Academy. He exhibited another 144 paintings at the British Institution (BI) between 1813 and 1854. In 1825, he won a premium of £100 from the BI for his painting titled The Battle of Trafalgar, which was subsequently purchased by Lord Northwick. In 2010, the painting was accepted in lieu of inheritance tax and allocated to East Ayrshire Council which displayed it locally at the Baird Institute in Cumnock. Wilson was one of the founders of the Society of British Artists where he exhibited extensively throughout his working life. He was its president for the year 1827. In 1827, he was also elected an honorary member of the Scottish Academy.

== See also ==
- John James Wilson (1818–1875) (Young Jock), son, also a painter
- William John Wilson (1833–1909), grandson, theatre scene painter and manager.
