= USS Mayflower (PY-1) =

Patrol vessel of the United States Navy

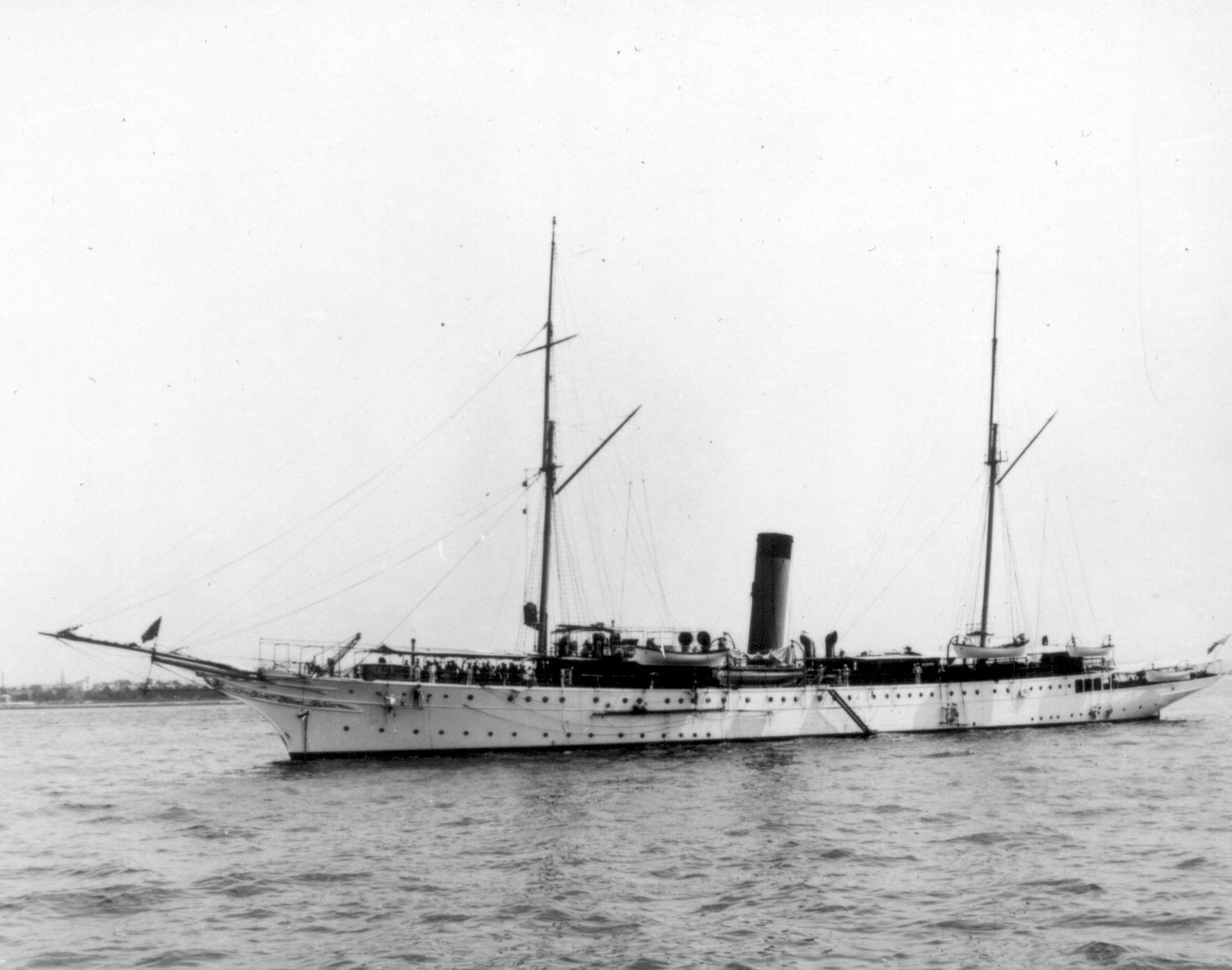
- USS Mayflower in 1905

History

United States
- Name: Mayflower
- Owner: Ogden Goelet
- Builder: J & G Thomson, Clydebank, Scotland
- Launched: 17 November 1896
- Fate: Purchased by the US Navy, 24 March 1898

United States
- Name: Mayflower
- Acquired: 24 March 1898
- Commissioned: 24 March 1898
- Decommissioned: 1 November 1904
- Recommissioned: 25 July 1905
- Decommissioned: 22 March 1929
- Fate: Sold to private ownership, 19 October 1931

United States
- Name: Butte
- Acquired: by purchase, 31 July 1942
- Fate: Transferred to the Coast Guard, 6 September 1943

United States
- Name: Mayflower
- Commissioned: 19 October 1943
- Decommissioned: 1 July 1946
- Fate: Sold to private ownership, 8 January 1947

Panama
- Name: Malla
- Fate: Unknown

General characteristics
- Tonnage: 1,009 GRT
- Displacement: 2,690 t (2,650 long tons)
- Length: 275 ft (84 m) w.l.
- Beam: 36 ft (11 m)
- Draft: 17 ft 2.5 in (5.245 m)
- Installed power: 4,700 ihp (3,500 kW)
- Propulsion: 2 × Triple expansion 4-cylinder, double-acting steam engines; 2 × Screws
- Sail plan: Brigantine
- Speed: 16.8 kn (31.1 km/h; 19.3 mph)
- Complement: 171
- Armament: 6 × 6-pounder guns

USS Mayflower (PY-1) (later as USCGC Mayflower (WPG-183)) was a 275 ft (84 m), 2,690 t (2,650 LT) motor vessel originally built as a private yacht that went on to serve in a variety of military, governmental, and commercial roles.

Mayflower had an long and diverse career: aside from serving as a private yacht and merchant ship, she was also the presidential yacht for five United States presidents (T. Roosevelt, Taft, Wilson, Harding, and Coolidge). She also served as a warship, and was one of the only US Navy ships to have been in active commissioned service during the Spanish–American War, World War I, and World War II.

== Private yacht ==
Mayflower was launched in 1896, by J. and G. Thompson, of Clydebank, Scotland, as a luxurious steam yacht for millionaire Ogden Goelet, who died on board her in August 1897. Her sister ship, Nahma, said to be almost identical, although being longer, was built at the same time and in the same yard for Goelet's brother, Robert Goelet, later became USS Nahma.

== Spanish–American War ==
With the Spanish–American War requiring that the US Navy expand rapidly, she was purchased by the Navy from Goelet's estate and commissioned at the New York Navy Yard, as Mayflower, on 24 March 1898.

Mayflower joined Admiral William T. Sampson's squadron at Key West, Florida, on 20 April. Two days later, the squadron sailed to blockade Havana, Cuba. En route, Mayflower captured the Spanish schooner Santiago Apostol. She also took a number of fishing boats and coastal trading vessels. On 11 May, she boarded a large British merchant steamer, which also carried the name Mayflower, and sent the blockade runner to the United States, under a prize crew. On 14 May, Alfonso led two Spanish gunboats out of the harbor hoping to break through the American blockade. Mayflower's guns engaged the Spanish warships and drove them back to shelter under the guns of Morro Castle. For the rest of the war, Mayflower guarded the ports of Santiago de Cuba and Cienfuegos.

== Caribbean ==
Early in 1899, the yacht steamed to New York, where she decommissioned on 2 February, to be fitted out for special service in Puerto Rican waters. She recommissioned on 15 June 1900. At San Juan, she served as headquarters for the government of the island being formed by the first American Governor Charles H. Allen.

In 1902, Mayflower twice served as Admiral George Dewey's flagship. In November 1903, Rear Admiral Joseph Coghlan, flew his flag when off Panama, during the revolution which established Panamanian independence and pointed toward the construction of the Panama Canal. She sailed to Europe in the summer of 1904, and in the fall carried Secretary of War William Howard Taft, on an inspection tour of the West Indies. Mayflower was decommissioned at New York, on 1 November 1904, for conversion to a presidential yacht.

== US presidential yacht ==
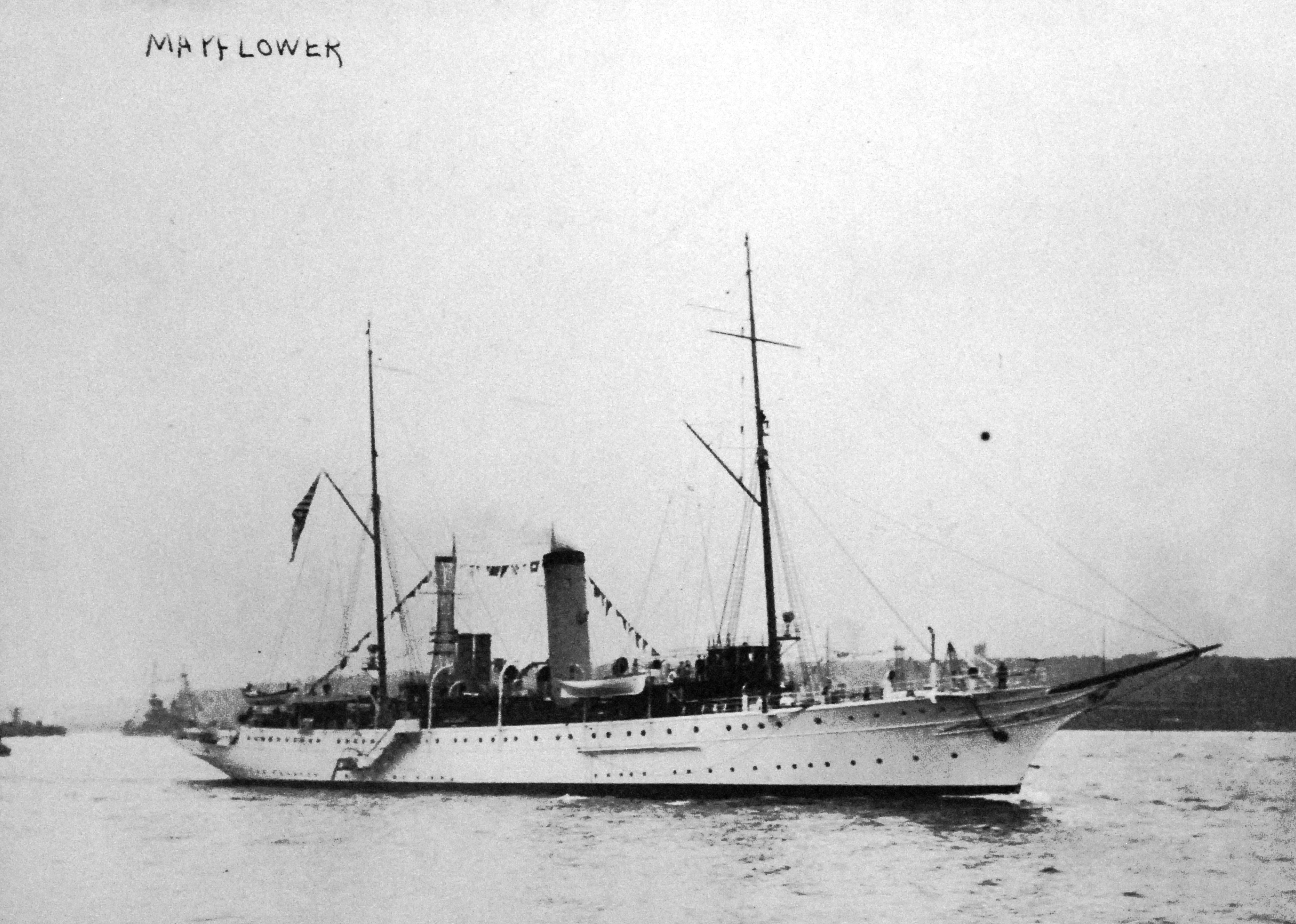
Presidential yacht Mayflower in 1912

Recommissioned on 25 July 1905, with Commander Cameron Winslow, in command, she immediately sailed for Oyster Bay, Long Island, New York, to prepare for the peace conference which ended the Russo-Japanese War. President Theodore Roosevelt, introduced the Russian and Japanese delegations on board Mayflower, on 5 August. The ship continued to play a prominent role in support of the negotiations, which won Roosevelt the Nobel Peace Prize.

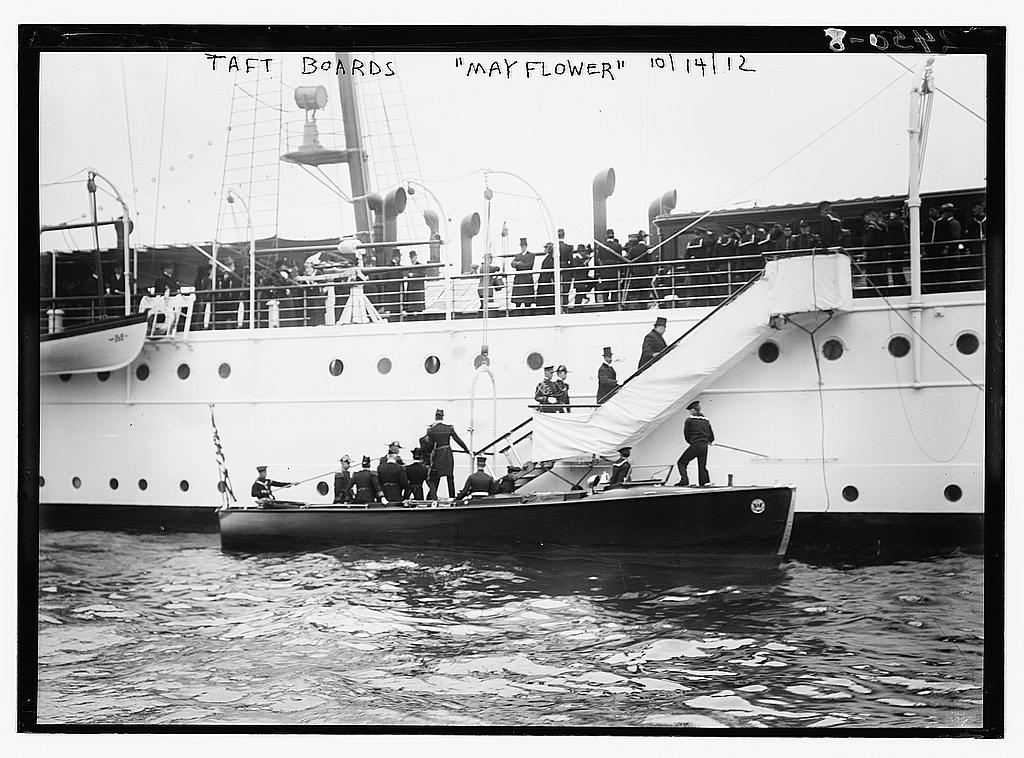
President Taft boards Mayflower on 14 October 1912

After duty as a dispatch boat protecting American interests in Santo Domingo, in 1906, Mayflower served as presidential yacht until 1929. On 22 July 1908, she collided with the American 211 GRT schooner Menawa, in Long Island Sound; Menawa was lost, but all six people aboard her survived.

Mayflower was the scene of many diplomatic and social events during her years as the presidential yacht. Many members of the world's royal families visited the yacht and numerous persons of great prominence signed her guestbook. President Woodrow Wilson, selected Mayflower as the setting for much of his courtship of Edith Bolling Galt.

One of Herbert Hoover's early acts as president was to dispense with Mayflower as an economy measure, saving upkeep costs of $300,000 per year, equivalent to $5,625,000 in 2025. She was decommissioned at the Philadelphia Navy Yard, on 22 March 1929, and her Filipino stewards and much of her furniture were transferred to the presidential retreat at Rapidan Camp. Placed up for auction, there were no bidders, and the ship was recommissioned for military use. During this overhaul at the Philadelphia Navy Yard, an intense fire broke out on 24 January 1931. So much water was pumped into her, that she sank and had to be raised.

== Private ownership ==
The yacht was sold on 19 October 1931, to Leo P. Coe, agent for Frank P. Parish, a wealthy financier known as "The boy wizard of LaSalle Street" (Chicago's Wall Street). The following year while he was having the ship restored to her original luxurious splendor, by Henry J. Gielow Inc., of New York City, Parish's fortunes turned forcing him to sell the yacht shortly before he fled from the country to escape from prosecution and elude irate investors. During the Depression years, a number of successive owners tried to promote a wide variety of projects for the ship, including use in the South America coastal trade, restoration as a historic relic, use as a floating dance salon, and even sale to the Japanese Government to be scrapped as Japan sought still to strengthen her war machine. However, a complex web of legal difficulties, a shortage of money, and marginal business conditions frustrated these enterprises while the ship idled in Atlantic ports from New York to Jacksonville, Florida, awaiting an opportunity for future service.

== Service in USCG and US Navy during World War II ==
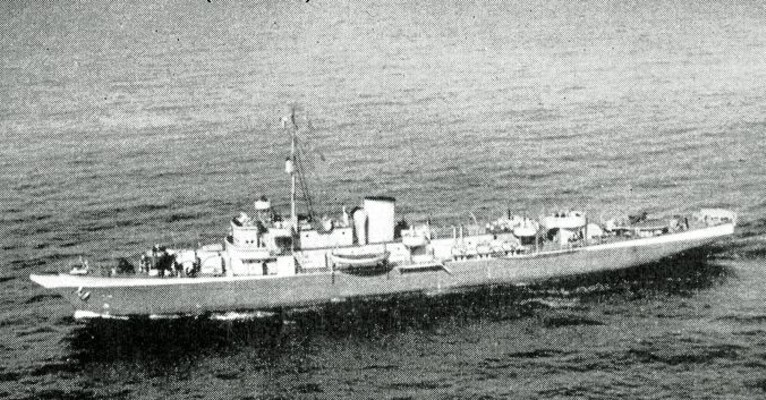
Mayflower in US Coast Guard during World War II

After the US entered World War II, the War Shipping Administration (WSA) purchased Mayflower from Broadfoot Iron Works Inc., Wilmington, North Carolina, on 31 July 1942, and renamed her Butte. Transferred to the Coast Guard on 6 September 1943, the ship was recommissioned as USCGC Mayflower (WPG-183) on 19 October 1943. She patrolled the Atlantic coast guarding against German U-boats and escorted coastal shipping besides serving as a radar training ship at Norfolk and Boston.

== As a commercial vessel ==
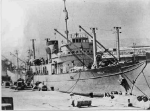
SS Mala 1948

Decommissioned on 1 July 1946, Mayflower was sold at Baltimore, to Frank M. Shaw, on 8 January 1947, for use in the Arctic as a sealer. However, while sailing for sealing waters between Greenland and Labrador, early in March, Mayflower was damaged by fire off Point Lookout, Maryland, and forced to return to Baltimore. Collins Distributors Inc., purchased the ship early in 1948, installed new boilers in her at New York, and documented her as SS Malla, under the Panamanian flag. She was subsequently fitted out at Genoa, Italy, ostensibly for coastwise trade in the Mediterranean. One of her last voyages, in 1948, she was contracted to sail Jewish refugees to the port of Haifa, Israel. After sailing secretly from Marseille, France, she arrived at Haifa, 3 September. Most of those on board were former passengers of the ill-fated Exodus, which had been turned back from Palestine, the previous summer.

== Awards ==
- Sampson Medal (1898)
- Spanish Campaign Medal (1898)
- World War I Victory Medal (1917–1918)
- American Campaign Medal (1942–1946)
- World War II Victory Medal (1942–1946)

== Bibliography ==
- Medina, Miriam. "Death of Ogden Goelet 1897". The History Box. Archived from the original on 30 May 2016.
- Hofman, Erik (1970). The Steam Yachts – An Era of Elegance. New York: John De Graff, Inc.
- "Mayflower II (PY-1)". Dictionary of American Naval fighting ships. Naval History and Heritage Command.
- "Department of Commerce and Labor Bureau of Navigation Forty-First Annual List of Merchant Vessels of the United States for the Year Ending June 30, 1909". Washington, D.C.: Government Printing Office. 1909.
- "A Tour for Docents of The Presidential Yacht Potomac" (PDF). The Potomac Association.
- Wert, Hal Elliott (January 2005). Hoover, the Fishing President: Portrait of the Private Man and His Life. Stackpole Books. ISBN 0-8117-0099-2.
- Howard, Spencer (18 September 2018). "Hoover Presidential Library". When is a yacht not a Yacht.
- Antoniello, Anthony (21 April 2017). "A Mayflower by Any Other Name".
