= Brodrick Hartwell =

British baronet (1909–1993)

Sir Brodrick William Charles Elwin Hartwell, 5th Baronet (1909–1993) was a British baronet, the fifth of the Hartwell baronets of Dale Hall in the County of Essex.

== Biography ==
Born on 7 August 1909, the son of Sir Brodrick Cecil Denham Arkwright Hartwell, 4th Baronet (1876-1948), Sir Broderick Hartwell, 5th Baronet was educated at Bedford School. He was the fifth of the Hartwell baronets of Dale Hall in the County of Essex, created on 26 October 1805 for Admiral Francis Hartwell, succeeding to the title upon the death of his father, the 4th Baronet, on 24 November 1948.

During the Second World War he served as a captain with the Leicestershire Regiment. He was dismissed from the army on 30 April 1949.

He was succeeded by his son, Sir Francis Anthony Charles Peter Hartwell, 6th Baronet (born 1940).

Sir Broderick Hartwell, 5th Baronet died on 14 December 1993.

Baronetage of the United Kingdom
Preceded by Brodrick Hartwell	Baronet (of Dale Hall); 1948–1993	Succeeded by Anthony Hartwell
