= Josephine Hartwell Shaw =

American jeweler 1865 – 1941

Josephine Hartwell Shaw (1865–1941) was an American jeweler and metalworker known for her Arts and Crafts style jewelry.

Shaw, née Hartwell, was born in 1865. She attended the Massachusetts State Normal School and the Pratt Institute.

In the early 1900s she married fellow artist Frederick A. Shaw. In 1910 Hartwell Shaw was elected Master Craftsman in the field of metalwork at The Society of Arts and Crafts of Boston. She taught drawing at the public schools in Providence, Rhode Island and then at the William Penn Charter School. She exhibited at the 1930 Boston Tercentenary Fine Arts and Crafts Exhibition where she won a medal.

Her work is in the Museum of Fine Arts Boston. Her work was included in the 2018 exhibition Boston Made:Arts and Crafts Jewelry and Metalwork Frank Gardner Hale and His Circle at the MFA.
