= Dr. Hauschka =

German skincare company

- Industry: Beauty
- Founded: 1967
- Founder: Rudolf Hauschka
- Headquarters: Germany
- Key people: Martina Joseph
- Parent: WALA Heilmittel

Dr. Hauschka is a German skincare company that produces natural skincare products using biodynamic, fair trade, and sustainably produced ingredients.

== History ==
Dr. Hauschka was founded in 1967 in Germany by chemist Rudolf Hauschka. Hauschka had co-founded WALA Heilmittel ("WALA"), a holistic pharmaceutical company, in 1935. The concept for the company, using holistic ingredients to create medicines, was inspired by the organic farming work of Rudolf Steiner. Esthetician Elisabeth Sigmund contacted Hauschka in the early 1960s about her research using herbs in skincare. Sigmund and Hauschka worked together for two years to create what would become Dr. Hauschka.

The first product created was a facial oil made with essential oils.

In 2017, the brand launched a make up line. As of 2019, Martina Joseph serves as Dr. Hauschka's chief executive officer.

== Products ==
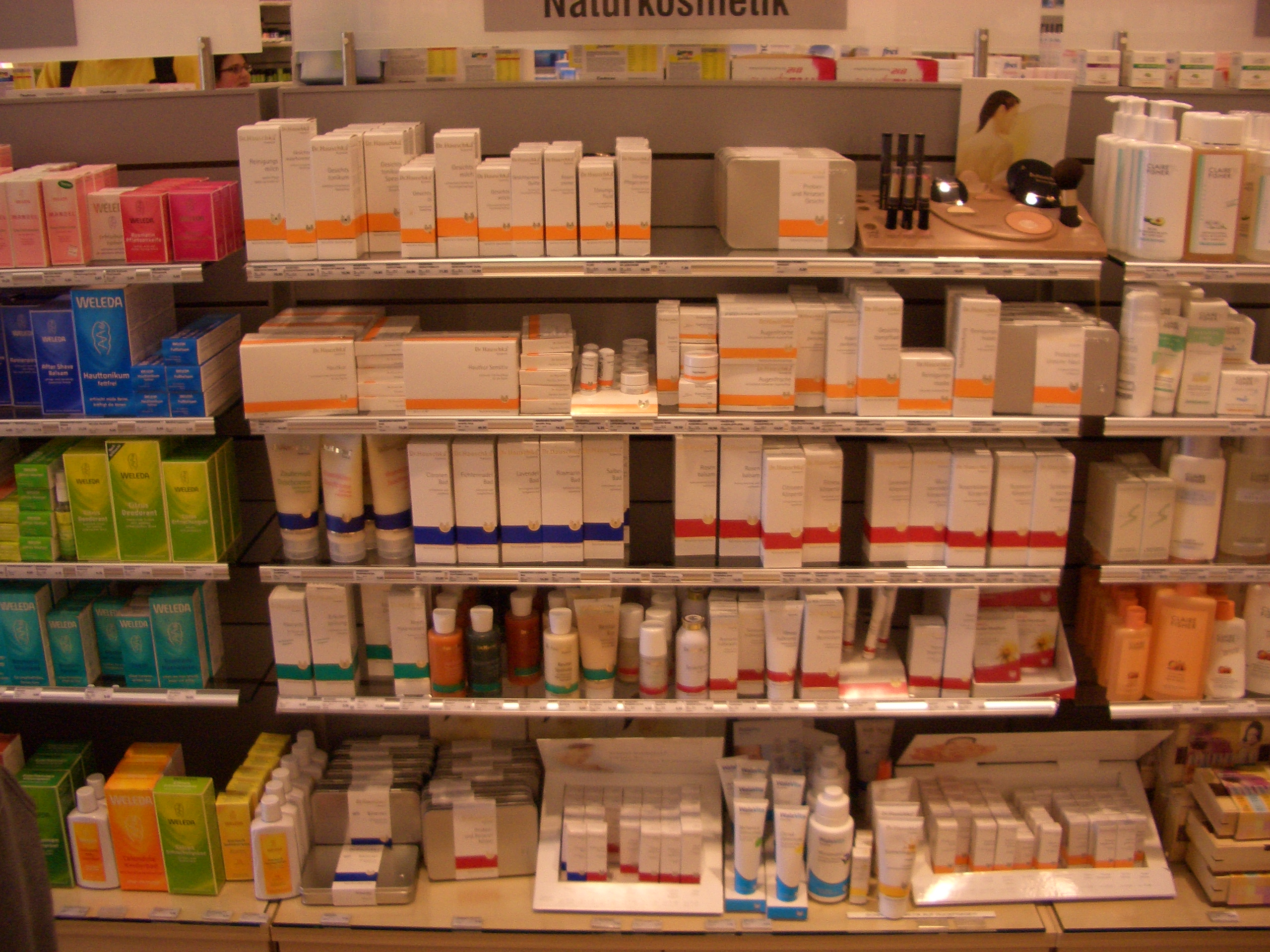
Dr. Hauschka products on display at a German drug store.

The company produces face and body products, including face creams, hair care, makeup, bronzers, bath oils, and deodorant. Dr. Hauschka uses organic and biodynamic ingredients grown in company-owned and operated German farms.

The brand's products have been endorsed by Jennifer Lopez, Anne Hathaway, Julia Roberts, Jennifer Aniston, and Nikki Reed.

Estheticians are trained at the Dr. Hauschka Academy in Germany. At the academy, they are taught about the products and how to give facials.
