= Rudolf Hauschka =

Austrian chemist, businessman and writer (1891–1969)

- Born: 8 November 1891; Vienna, Austria-Hungary
- Died: 28 December 1969 (aged 78); Bad Boll, Germany
- Occupations: Chemist; Author; inventor; entrepreneur; anthroposophist]
- Known for: Founder of WALAHeilmittel GmbH and Dr. Hauschka

Rudolf Hauschka (6 November 1891 – 28 December 1969) was an Austrian chemist, author, inventor, entrepreneur and anthroposophist.

He was the founder of the company Wala Heilmittel GmbH and Dr. Hauschka. He is the inventor of a "rhythmic" production process that excluded the use of alcohol as a preservative of plant extracts and can preserve the extract for over 30 years. 'Dr. Hauschka' is the brand name given to the range of skin care and cosmetics made by the Wala company from his research.

== Biography ==
Rudolf Hauschka was born in Vienna, Austria-Hungary on 6 November 1891. From 1908, he studied chemistry and medicine in Vienna and Munich. He graduated with his doctorate in June 1914 and participated in the First World War as a medical officer. After the War he went on several scientific expeditions. His travels took him to Australia, India and Egypt.

He was introduced to Anthroposophy by Karl Schubert, a Waldorf educator, and became president of the Wandervogel movement in Austria.

His works take into account rhythmic processes found in nature. Rudolf Steiner influenced him greatly and anthroposophical medicine became his methodological approach to the study of nature, medicine, plants and natural phenomena.

In 1935, Hauschka founded the first WALA Laboratory near Ludwigsburg and later in 1953 this became WALA- Heilmittel Laboratorium. According to Hauschka himself, one of the most prominent people he met during this period was Otto Ohlendorf, the Nazi war criminal. In 1942 while in Vienna Hauschke married the anthroposophical doctor Margaret Stavenhagen whom he had first met in the Ita Wegman Clinical Therapeutic Institute in Arlesheim in 1929. R. Hauschka's weighing experiments were repeated by Stefan Baumgaertner and published in 1992.

Hauschka died on 28 December 1969 in Bad Boll, Germany.

== Works ==
- Substance doctrine. To understand the physics, chemistry and therapeutic effects of the substances. Klostermann, Frankfurt am Main 1942, 12 A. 2007, ISBN 3-465-03518-6
- Nutrition education. To understand the physiology of digestion and the ponderablen Imponderables and qualities of the food substances. With an appendix by Dr. Hauschka Grethe: Practical Diet Tips for Healthy and sick. Klostermann, Frankfurt am Main 1951; 10th A. 1999, ISBN 3-465-03021-4
- Therapeutic teaching. A contribution to a contemporary therapeutic knowledge. With the cooperation of Dr. Margarethe Hauschka. Klostermann, Frankfurt am Main 1965; 6 A. 2004, ISBN 3-465-03328-0
- Wetterleuchten a time shift. Living memory of a natural scientist. Klostermann, Frankfurt am Main 1966 revised paperback edition: Verlag natural human-medicine, Bad Boll, 1997; 2nd unv. A. 2007, ISBN 3-928914-07-3
- The Nature of Substance ISBN 1-85584-122-3
- Nutrition ISBN 1-85584-117-7
- Heilmittellehre
- Ernaehrungslehre (both in German only)
- At the Dawn of a New Age—Memoirs of a Scientist, Canada: Steiner Book Centre 1985. Editor of English edition.

== See also ==
- Anthroposophical medicine
- Naturopathy

== Sources ==
- WALA-Stiftung (Hg.): Rudolf Hauschka. To return his 100th Birthday on 6 November 1991. Publisher natural human-medicine, Bad Boll 1991
- Stephan Baumgartner: Hauschkas Wägeversuche. Weight variations of germinating plants in a closed system. Verlag am Goetheanum (Mathematisch-Astronomische leaves NF 16), Dornach 1992, ISBN 3-7235-0646-1
