= HMS Eglinton =

Two ships of the Royal Navy have borne the name HMS Eglinton.

- HMS Eglinton (1916) was a Racecourse-class minesweeper launched in 1916 and sold in 1922.
- HMS Eglinton (L87) was a Hunt-class destroyer launched in 1939 and scrapped in 1956.
