= HMCS Wolf =

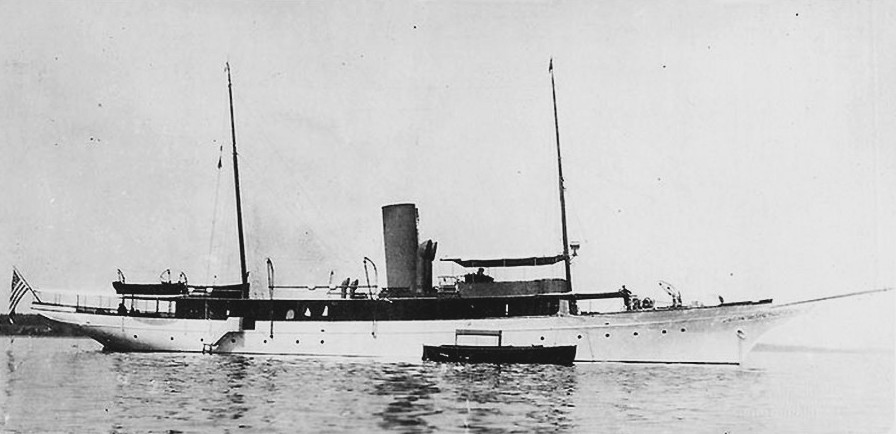
- As Wenonah

History
- Name: Wenonah; Stranger; Blue Water; Gulfsteam
- Port of registry: United States
- Builder: George Lawley & Sons, Neponset, Massachusetts
- Completed: 1915
- In service: 1915
- Out of service: 1947
- Fate: Sold to United States Navy 1917–1928; Sold to Royal Canadian Navy 1940–1945; Wrecked off Powell River, British Columbia, 1947

United States
- Name: Wenonah
- Commissioned: 8 June 1917
- Decommissioned: 12 April 1919
- Identification: SP-165
- Fate: Sold for commercial use 1928

Canada
- Name: Wolf
- Acquired: 1940
- Commissioned: 2 October 1940
- Decommissioned: 16 May 1945
- Fate: Sold for commercial use 1946

General characteristics as Canadian armed yacht
- Type: Armed yacht
- Displacement: 320 long tons (330 t)
- Length: 172 ft (52.4 m)
- Beam: 23 ft (7.0 m)
- Draught: 10 ft (3.0 m)
- Speed: 10 knots (19 km/h; 12 mph)
- Complement: 43
- Armament: 1 × QF 12-pounder 12 cwt naval gun; 1 × 2-pounder gun

HMCS Wolf was an armed yacht of the Royal Canadian Navy during World War II that saw service on the British Columbia Coast of Canada. Constructed in 1915 as the yacht Wenowah, with the US entry into World War I, the vessel was taken into United States Navy service as USS Wenonah (SP-165) as a patrol ship. The vessel escorted convoys between the United States and Europe and between Gibraltar and Bizerte, Tunis and Genoa, Italy. After the war, Wenonah was loaned to the United States Coast and Geodetic Survey for three and a half years before being sold to private interests in 1928. In private ownership, the vessel was renamed at least twice, including Stranger and Blue Water.

With the onset of World War II, the Royal Canadian Navy sought vessels capable of patrol duties. However, a lack of Canadian ships led them to acquiring vessels from their southern neighbour. Blue Water was acquired in 1940 for service on the British Columbia coast and used a patrol vessel. Following the war, the ship was sold again to commercial ownership and renamed Gulfstream. Gulfstream was wrecked off Powell River, British Columbia on 11 October 1947.

== Description ==
Wenonah measured 290 gross register tons (GRT), 163 feet (49.7 m) long overall and 143 feet 4 inches (43.7 m) between perpendiculars with a beam of 22 feet 10 inches (7.0 m) and a draught of 10 feet (3.0 m). The ship was propelled by one shaft powered by a vertical triple expansion steam engine giving the ship a maximum speed of 12 knots (22 km/h; 14 mph). In United States Navy service the ship had a complement of 65 personnel and was armed with two 3"/50 caliber guns.

In Canadian service, the vessel measured 320 long tons (330 t), 172 feet (52.4 m) long with a beam of 23 feet (7.0 m) and a draught of 10 feet (3.0 m). The ship had a maximum speed of 10 knots (19 km/h; 12 mph) and was armed with one QF 12-pounder 12 cwt naval gun and one 2-pounder gun. Wolf had a complement of 5 officers and 38 ratings.

== Service history ==
=== As Wenonah ===
Wenonah was a yacht constructed in 1915 by George Lawley & Sons at their yard in Neponset, Massachusetts. With the US entry into World War I, the United States Navy (USN) sought out ships for its section patrol and acquired Wenonah from Walter G. Ladd. The U.S. Navy acquired Wenonah on 8 June 1917 and gave her the hull identification number SP-165. (Note: Silverstone has the date on 8 August.) She was commissioned as USS Wenonah on 22 October 1917.

Wenonah departed Newport, Rhode Island with five other patrol ships and a tender, towing submarine chasers to Gibraltar via Bermuda and the Azores. The convoy arrived on 25 December 1917 and beginning on 15 January 1918 Wenonah was used to escort convoys between Gibraltar and Bizerte, Tunisia.

In March 1918, Wenonah was in the Mediterranean Sea as part of the escort of a 15-ship Gibraltar-to-Bizerte convoy also escorted by the Royal Navy warship HMS Jeannette II, the U.S. Navy gunboat USS Nashville, and two French naval trawlers. During the night of 25–26 March, an enemy submarine torpedoed one of the convoy's ships, and one of the trawlers dropped back to escort the damaged ship. At daybreak on 26 March, several of the convoy's ships reported a suspicious object to port; Wenonah's crew also sighted it and manned her guns, but determined that the object was not a submarine. Meanwhile, Jeannette II sighted a submarine on the surface ahead of the convoy. The submarine submerged, and Jeannette II dropped two depth charges, forcing it back to surface. Several ships in the convoy then opened fire on the submarine, as did Wenonah at a range of 1,000 yards (910 m). Wenonah fired twelve rounds, inflicting considerable damage on the submarine before the convoy overtook it, then ceased fire to avoid hitting ships in the convoy. Members of the submarine's crew then appeared on deck and waved their arms, and the convoy's escorts discovered that she was the French Navy submarine Watt. Jeannette II and one of the trawlers went to Watt's assistance. Under attack by Wenonah, Watt had suffered two dead — her commanding officer and a seaman — and four wounded. Jeannette II took off Watt's wounded, and the trawler escorted Watt into port. A joint court of inquiry into the friendly fire incident with one American, two British, and two French naval officers as members took place at Gibraltar and found no one to blame. Another joint court of inquiry consisting of two British and two French naval officers took place at Bizerte, and also found no one to blame, concluding that Watt had disobeyed orders governing submarines operating in the area.

In July 1918, Wenonah escorted a convoy to Genoa, Italy. During this operation, one of the vessels she was escorting, SS Messidor, was torpedoed on 23 July. Wenonah recovered the survivors after dropping one depth charge on a suspected contact. The following day, 24 July, SS Rutherglen was torpedoed. Once again Wenonah dropped a depth charge, but this time it failed to detonate and the patrol ship turned to rescue work, recovering 38 of Rutherglen's crew. During the rest of the convoy's voyage Wenonah dropped several more depth charges and fired a 3-inch (76.2 mm) shell at suspected contacts, but no further engagement with the enemy was had before the end of the journey. Wenonah returned to Gibraltar–Bizerte convoys until the end of the war on 11 November 1918.

Wenowah returned to the US in December 1918 and remained in naval service until 12 April 1919. The vessel was then transferred to the United States Department of Commerce for service in the United States Coast and Geodetic Survey and given the hull number PY-11. Wenonah spent three and a half years with Coast ad Geodetic Survey before transferring back to the U.S. Navy in October 1922, joining the 13th Naval District on the United States West Coast and reclassified as a converted yacht. Wenonah remained in USN service from November 1922 to June 1928, when she was stricken from the Navy List. The vessel was sold on 15 May 1929 to H. W. Goodall of Santa Barbara, California, for $7,000 and renamed Stranger. Goodall sold Stranger to Mrs. Marian Huntington of San Francisco during the Great Depression.

=== As Wolf ===
To augment the local sea defences of coastal ports, the Royal Canadian Navy (RCN) sought large, steel-hulled yachts to requisition. However, a significant lack of capable vessels were owned by Canadians. Canada turned to its southern neighbour for suitable ships, finding several that met the navy's requirements. However, US neutrality laws prevented their sale to belligerents in the war. In order to circumvent these laws, the RCN requisitioned the yachts of prominent Canadian yachtsmen and then sent them to the US to purchase the yachts that had been identified by the navy without the US government knowing they were working for the navy. The money to acquire the vessels was provided by the Canadian government through bank loans.

While acquiring the yacht Breezin Thru for Clarence Wallace, Irving Keenleyside, an executive with the Burrard Dry Dock Company, spotted another yacht that fit the RCN's requirements. The yacht, Blue Water, was deemed acceptable after an investigation and Keenleyside sought the government's permission to purchase the vessel. He gave the name of his partner, E. A. Riddell, who was unaware of the program at the time of the call. The RCN then requisitioned Riddell's yacht upon approval in order to keep the real source of the funds secret.

Conversion to an armed yacht involved removing most of the luxurious finery and installing naval hardware. The ship was armed with a 12-pounder gun, depth charges and machine guns. The ship was later given a 1-inch anti-aircraft gun for training purposes. The ship was commissioned into the RCN on 2 October 1940. Wolf was used to patrol the Strait of Juan de Fuca and the mouth of the Fraser River after entering service. The ship remained with the Esquimalt Force for the entire war, though as the war progressed, Wolf was used for training and then after September 1943, as an examination vessel. The yacht was paid off on 16 May 1945 and by August the ship was laid up for sale.

The ship was purchased by Gulf Lines as a coastal ferry in 1946. Renamed Gulfstream, she was wrecked off Powell River, British Columbia, Canada, on 11 October 1947.
