= HMS Plumpton =

Minesweeper of the Royal Navy

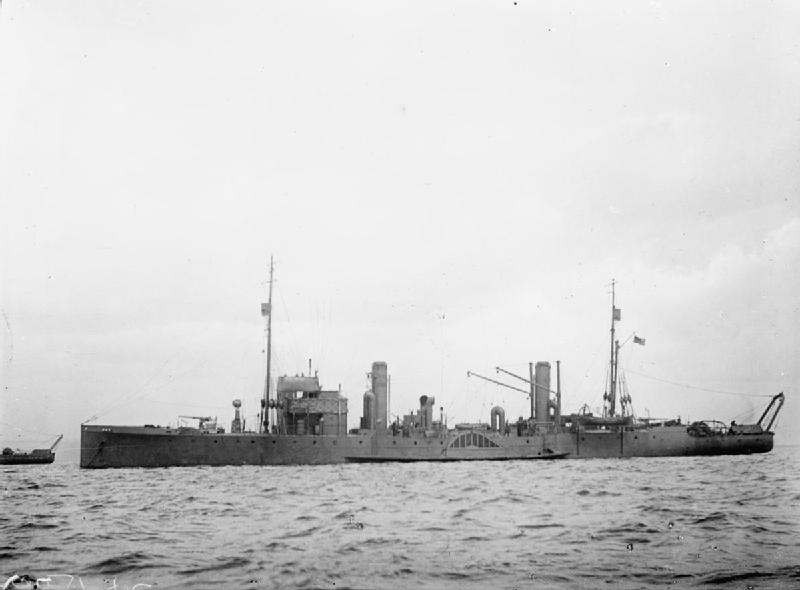
- HMS Plumpton circa 1916–1918

History

United Kingdom
- Name: Plumpton
- Namesake: Plumpton Racecourse
- Ordered: September 1915
- Builder: McMillan, Dumbarton, Scotland
- Launched: 20 March 1916
- Commissioned: June 1916
- Fate: Broken up after being mined

General characteristics
- Class & type: Racecourse-class minesweeper
- Displacement: 810 long tons (820 t)
- Length: 245 ft 9 in (74.9 m) oa
- Beam: 29 ft 0 in (8.8 m); 58 ft 0 in (17.7 m) (including paddles)
- Draught: 7 ft 0 in (2.1 m)
- Propulsion: Paddle wheel diagonal compound steam engine; Cylindrical boilers; 1,500 ihp (1,119 kW)
- Speed: 14 1/2 knots (26.9 km/h)
- Endurance: 156 long tons (159 t) coal
- Armament: 2 × 6-pounder (57 mm, 2.2 in) guns; 2 × 2-pounder (40 mm, 1.6 in) guns

HMS Plumpton was a Racecourse-class minesweeper of the British Royal Navy. She served in the First World War and was of a paddle wheel design. She struggled in heavy seas. Plumpton was mined on 19 October 1918 off Ostend. The ship was beached on the Belgian coast and was broken up where she lay.

== Description ==
The Racecourse-class minesweeper design was developed during the First World War after the earlier success of converted paddle wheel ships. The vessel was propelled by a paddle wheel powered by diagonal compound engine fed steam by cylindrical boilers rated at 1,500 indicated horsepower (1,119 kW). A Racecourse-class minesweeper was capable of storing 156 long tons (159 t) of coal to use as fuel. The Racecourse-class minesweepers were 245 ft 9 in (74.9 m) long overall with a standard beam of 29 ft 0 in (8.8 m) and was 58 ft 0 in (17.7 m) including paddles. The vessel had a draught of 7 ft 0 in (2.1 m) and had a standard displacement of 810 long tons (820 t). Racecourse-class minesweepers were armed with two 6-pounder (57 mm, 2.2 in) guns and two 2-pounder (40 mm, 1.6 in) guns.

== Service history ==
Plumpton was ordered as part of the first group of Racecourse-class minesweepers in September 1915. The ship was constructed by McMillan at their shipyard in Dumbarton, Scotland with the yard number 465 and launched on 20 March 1916. In keeping with the class, the ship was named for the racecourse in Plumpton, East Sussex and construction was completed in June 1916.

Plumpton was attached to the Grand Fleet on completion, being part of the 3rd Minesweeping Flotilla, which was equipped with Racecourse-class ships. The ship was still a member of the 3rd Minesweeping Flotilla in June 1917, but had transferred to the Dover Patrol the next month.

The minesweeper struck a naval mine off the coast of Ostend, Belgium on 19 October 1918. Plumpton was beached on the coast to prevent the ship from sinking. Plumpton was broken up for scrap at the site where she was beached.

== Sources ==
- Gardiner, Robert & Gray, Randal, eds. (1986). Conway's All the World's Fighting Ships 1906–1921. London: Conway Maritime Press. ISBN 0-85177-245-5.
- "Plumpton (6105675)". Miramar Ship Index.
