= Steven R. Little =

American chemical engineer

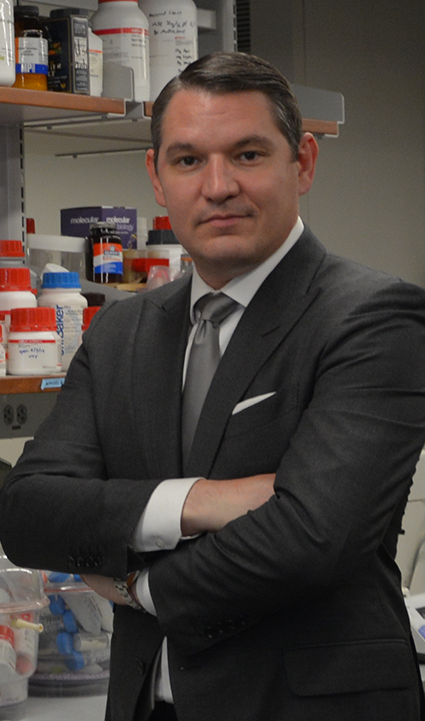
- Little in 2019
- Born: December 11, 1977 (age 48)
- Education: Youngstown State University (BS), Massachusetts Institute of Technology (PhD)
- Scientific career
- Fields: Controlled release, Pharmaceutical science, Drug delivery systems, Immunotherapies, Biomaterials, Regenerative medicine
- Workplaces: University of Pittsburgh
- Doctoral advisor: Robert Langer
- Website: www.littlelab.pitt.edu

Steven R. Little (born 1977) is an American chemical engineer and pharmaceutical scientist. He currently holds the title of Distinguished Professor and George M. and Eva M. Bevier Endowed Chair of Chemical Engineering at the University of Pittsburgh Swanson School of Engineering. He also holds secondary appointments in bioengineering, pharmaceutical sciences, immunology, ophthalmology and the McGowan Institute for Regenerative Medicine at the University of Pittsburgh.

== Education ==
Little received his BS in chemical engineering from Youngstown State University, and PhD from the Massachusetts Institute of Technology, studying under Institute Professor Robert S. Langer. His dissertation was “Poly(β-Amino Ester)s as pH Sensitive Biomaterials for Microparticulate Genetic Vaccine Delivery.”

== Research ==
Following his PhD in 2005, Little joined the faculty at the University of Pittsburgh John A. Swanson School of Engineering in 2006 as an assistant professor. He was promoted to the rank of associate professor as well as chair of the department of chemical engineering in 2012; William Kepler Whiteford Endowed Professor in 2015; and distinguished professor by Chancellor Patrick Gallagher in 2021. In 2024 he was appointed the Swanson School's George M. and Eva M. Bevier Endowed Chair.He stepped down as department chair in August 2026 and returned to faculty.

His research focuses on therapies that are biomimetic and replicate the biological function and interactions of living entities using synthetic systems. Areas of study include bioengineering, chemistry, chemical engineering, ophthalmology, and immunology, and the health issues addressed include autoimmune disease, battlefield wounds, cancer, HIV, Type I Diabetes, ocular disease, and organ transplantation.

He is the Principal Investigator of Little Lab, housed in Benedum Hall of Engineering, and the co-founder of Qrono Inc., a pharmaceutical startup company based in Pittsburgh and focused on next generation cancer treatments.

== Awards and honors ==
Little was elected as a Fellow of the Biomedical Engineering Society in 2015; the American Institute for Medical and Biological Engineering in 2016; and the American Association for the Advancement of Science and National Academy of Inventors in 2021. The American Association for the Advancement of Science (AAAS) elected him as Fellow in 2022, and Little was among eight members of the American Association of Pharmaceutical Scientists (AAPS) selected for elevation to Fellow status in 2024. In 2025 he was elected Fellow of AICHE.

Little was elected to the board of directors of the Society for Biomaterials and served in that role from 2013-2015. In June 2018 the Controlled Release Society appointed Little to its board as a director-at-large through 2021.

In 2012, the Society for Biomaterials named Little as the recipient of its Young Investigator Award and in 2018 the Controlled Release Society named Little the recipient of its Young Investigator Award. The Controlled Release Society in 2020 elected Little to its College of Fellows and followed in 2021 by presenting Little with its Distinguished Service Award. Little has received over 40 national and international awards including:

- American Heart Association Career Development Award (2007)
- NIH Research Career Development (K) Award (2007)
- Beckman Young Investigators Award from the Arnold & Mabel Beckman Foundation (2008)
- Coulter Translational Research Award (2011)
- Camille Dreyfus Teacher-Scholar, The Camille & Henry Dreyfus Foundation (2012)
- University of Pittsburgh's Chancellor's Distinguished Research Award (2012)
- Research to Prevent Blindness Innovative Ophthalmic Research Award (2014)
- Carnegie Science Award for Advanced Materials (2015)
- Curtis W. McGraw Research Award from the American Society for Engineering Education(2015)
- Controlled Release Society Young Investigator Award (2018)
- Pittsburgh Award, ACS Pittsburgh Section (2018)
- Controlled Release Society College of Fellows (2020)
- Controlled Release Society Distinguished Service Award (2021)

His teaching awards include the University of Pittsburgh Chancellor's Distinguished Teaching Award and a Carnegie Science Award for Post-Secondary Education. Community recognition includes Pittsburgh Magazine’s 40 Under 40, named a “Fast Tracker” by the Pittsburgh Business Times, and one of five individuals in Pittsburgh who are “reshaping our world” by Pop City Media.

== Humanitarian causes ==
Little serves on the board of directors for EduNations, an organization that establishes educational infrastructure by building schools, training teachers and providing children with free education in Sierra Leone, Africa.
