= William Hunter Dammond =

American civil engineer (1873–1956)

- Born: October 26, 1873; Pittsburgh, Pennsylvania, US
- Died: December 8, 1956 (aged 83); New York City, US
- Education: Western University of Pennsylvania
- Occupations: Civil engineer; educator
- Known for: Being an early African American in the civil engineering field
- Children: 1

William Hunter Dammond (October 26, 1873 – December 8, 1956) was an American civil engineer. He studied civil engineering at the Western University of Pennsylvania and, in 1893, was the first African American to graduate from that institution. As a black man Dammond found it difficult to secure employment as an engineer and, after a number of different roles, in 1897 found work as a professor at Paul Quinn College in Waco, Texas. From 1899 Dammond taught at Wilberforce University in Ohio but left to join the Michigan Central Railroad (MCR) in the early 1900s. At MCR he developed the Dammond circuit, a means of providing signals in drivers' cabs. In 1906 he developed a traffic light-like system for signalling. In 1910 Dammond moved to Britain to promote his signalling systems. Despite an extensive period of testing he was unsuccessful in selling it and found work as a bridge designer with Marcum Company.

Dammond returned to the US in 1916 and worked as a draftsman for US Steel at Farrell, Pennsylvania, and for Boston Structural Steel in Massachusetts. He afterwards moved to Ohio and, in the 1920s, to New York City. Dammond had some success in selling basic versions of his signalling systems to railroads in New York and Pennsylvania but suffered from infringement of his patents. In later life he worked as a draftsman for the New York City Board of Transportation but died a pauper.

== Early life ==
Dammond was born on October 26, 1873, to Lucy and Edward Dammond, a middle-class black family of Arthur Street, Pittsburgh. Dammond was the fifth of eight children. His father was a former porter and sailor (he had served in the US Navy during the American Civil War) who moved from Louisiana to work as a waiter in Pittsburgh. Dammond's mother was a former house servant who had moved from Winchester, Virginia. She was a member (and deaconess) of the Bethel African Methodist Episcopal Church and Dammond was involved with the church in his early life.

As a child Dammond attended the Park Institute, which had few black students at that time. He was taught algebra, English, geography, zoology, physiology, botany, German and drawing in preparation for university and was noted for his skill in mathematics. He went on to attend the Western University of Pennsylvania (now known as the University of Pittsburgh), studying civil engineering at what is now the Swanson School of Engineering. He was possibly the first beneficiary of a scholarship set up by the abolitionist Charles Avery in 1858. At this time few African Americans were admitted to engineering courses. Dammond was taught algebra, geometry, trigonometry, calculus, and surveying and opted to take additional courses in German, mechanics, astronomy, descriptive geometry, elocution, hydraulics, chemistry, and physics. Dammond graduated with an honors degree in June 1893. He was the first black graduate of the University of Pittsburgh. For a long time the university thought that John Coverdale Gilmer held this honor, but corrected the record in 2000.

== Teaching career ==
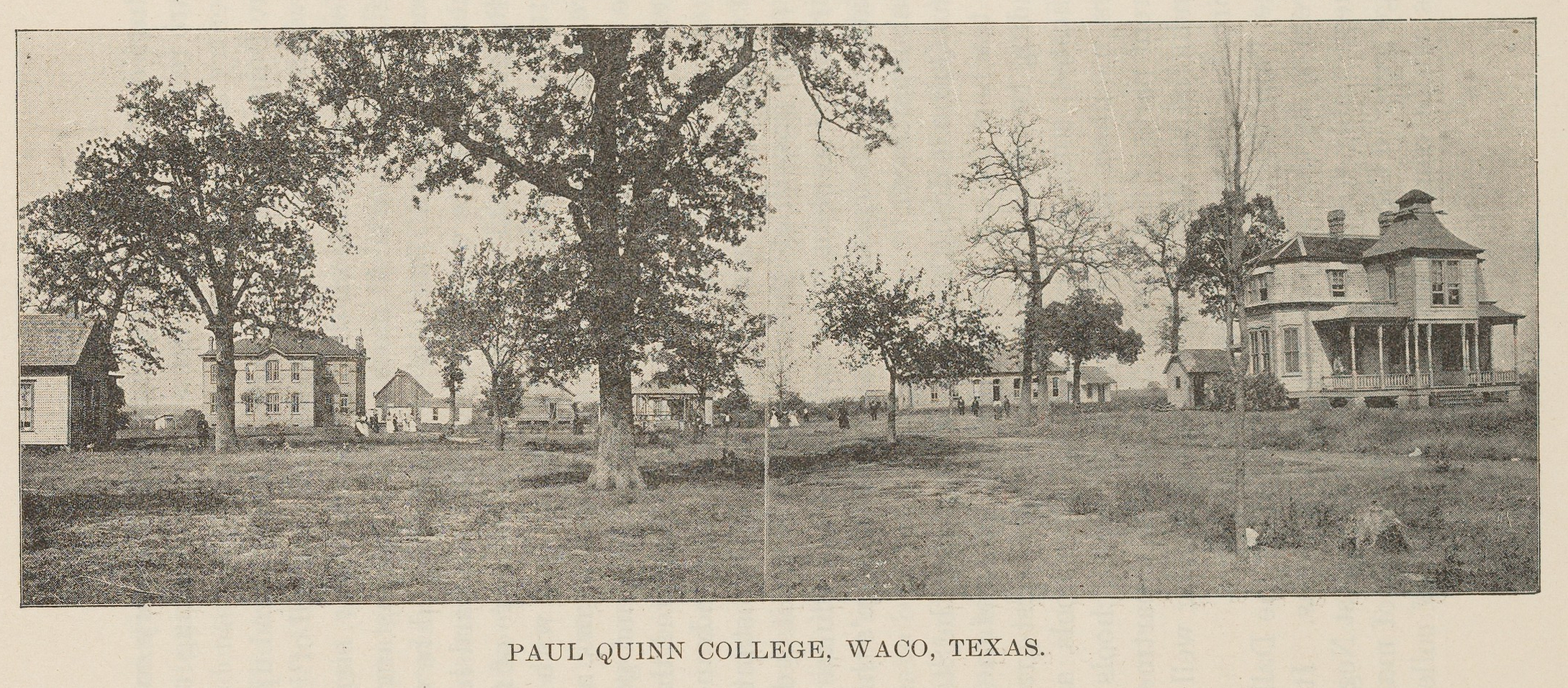
Paul Quinn College in 1898

After graduation Dammond struggled to find employment as a black man in engineering, he instead worked in Pittsburgh as a clerk, sewer contractor and printer. He moved to Waco, Texas, to work as a maths professor at Paul Quinn College, an African Methodist Episcopal Church college in 1897. In 1899 Dammond became a professor at Wilberforce University in Ohio. Whilst there he reached sufficient social standing to be invited to the 1900 inauguration of George K. Nash as governor of Ohio. He married school teacher Sarah Mabel Mofford on November 6, 1900.

== Railway engineering ==
Whilst teaching Dammond took numerous leaves of absence to practice as a civil engineer. He left the university in the early 1900s to move to Detroit to work as an assistant bridge engineer with the Michigan Central Railroad (MCR). At the MCR Dammond developed and patented a new railway signal system, the Dammond circuit, a track circuit-based system, in 1903. This was intended to replace the manual hand-signal system then in use and was vulnerable to human error. The system provided an audio and visual signal within the driver's cab, as opposed to the block signals previously used. It operated on alternating current, with a battery back-up.

Dammond assigned 25 percent of his 1903 patent to Edward M. Bryant of Detroit, to generate funds for future projects. Dammond developed a "clear, caution, danger" signal mechanism that was patented in 1906, it was light-based with red, amber and green signals and was used on lines between New York City and Washington, DC. Dammond travelled to Britain before 1910 to market his signalling mechanisms. By 1910 he was based in Chesterfield, Derbyshire, and installed a circuit on a stretch of track near Nottingham that was tested more than 1,000 times over 13 months. The system received praise but was not ultimately adopted.

Dammond's family joined him in Britain in 1911, as he intended to remain there to pursue longer-term business opportunities. Around this time and possibly because of the First World War interrupting his plans, Dammond took a position as a bridge designer with the British firm of Marcum Company. He was considered an expert on railway accidents in Britain and the US and published papers on this topic and on his signal systems. Dammond was covered in the 1915 Michigan Manual of Freedmen's Progress as an example of a notable African American in the state.

== Later career ==
Dammond and his family boarded the RMS Andania at London on July 5, 1916, for passage to New York. Upon his return they moved to Farrell, Pennsylvania, where Dammond found work as a draftsman at the US Steel plant there. In 1917 he joined Boston Structural Steel of Boston, Massachusetts, as a draftsman. He later moved to Marietta, Ohio, and then, in the 1920s, to New York to promote his signalling systems. Basic versions of the Dammond Circuit were used on the Long Island Rail Road, Pennsylvania Railroad, New York Central Railroad and New York City Subway.

Dammond suffered a loss of income from violations of his patents and it was rumored that he had been sent to Britain to allow his US patent rights to expire. By the 1940s he joined the New York City Board of Transportation as a structures draftsman. Dammond had a reputation for being distracted from everyday life by mathematical problems, solving them on napkins. On one occasion he was distracted by a problem and was struck by a motor vehicle after stepping off the curb.

Dammond died as a pauper in New York on December 8, 1956. He was estranged from his son and was saved from a pauper's burial by a nephew.
