= Scott X. Mao =

Scott X. Mao is the John Swanson Endowed Professor at the Swanson School of Engineering of the University of Pittsburgh. He is a specialist in the research on plasticity, deformation physics and fracture mechanics of materials, and atomic scale experimental mechanics. He is well known for work with in-situ transmission electron microscope and is amongst the most cited in the field (over 16,500 citations, H-index=65).

He serves as Editor in Chief for International Journal of Metallurgy and Metal Physics, and Editor for Advances in Metallurgical and Material Engineering. He is an Elected Fellow of the Canadian Academy of Engineering, an elected American Physical Society fellow, Elected Fellow of IAAM (International Association of Advanced Materials) and ASME fellow.

== Education ==
- Post - Doc., Mechanical Behaviour of Materials, Massachusetts Institute of Technology, 1989
- Ph.D, Mechanical Engineering, Tohoku University, 1988
- B.Sc., Solid Mechanics, Beijing University of Aeronautics, 1982
