= RMS Aurania (1916) =

Coordinates: 56°36′N 6°20′W

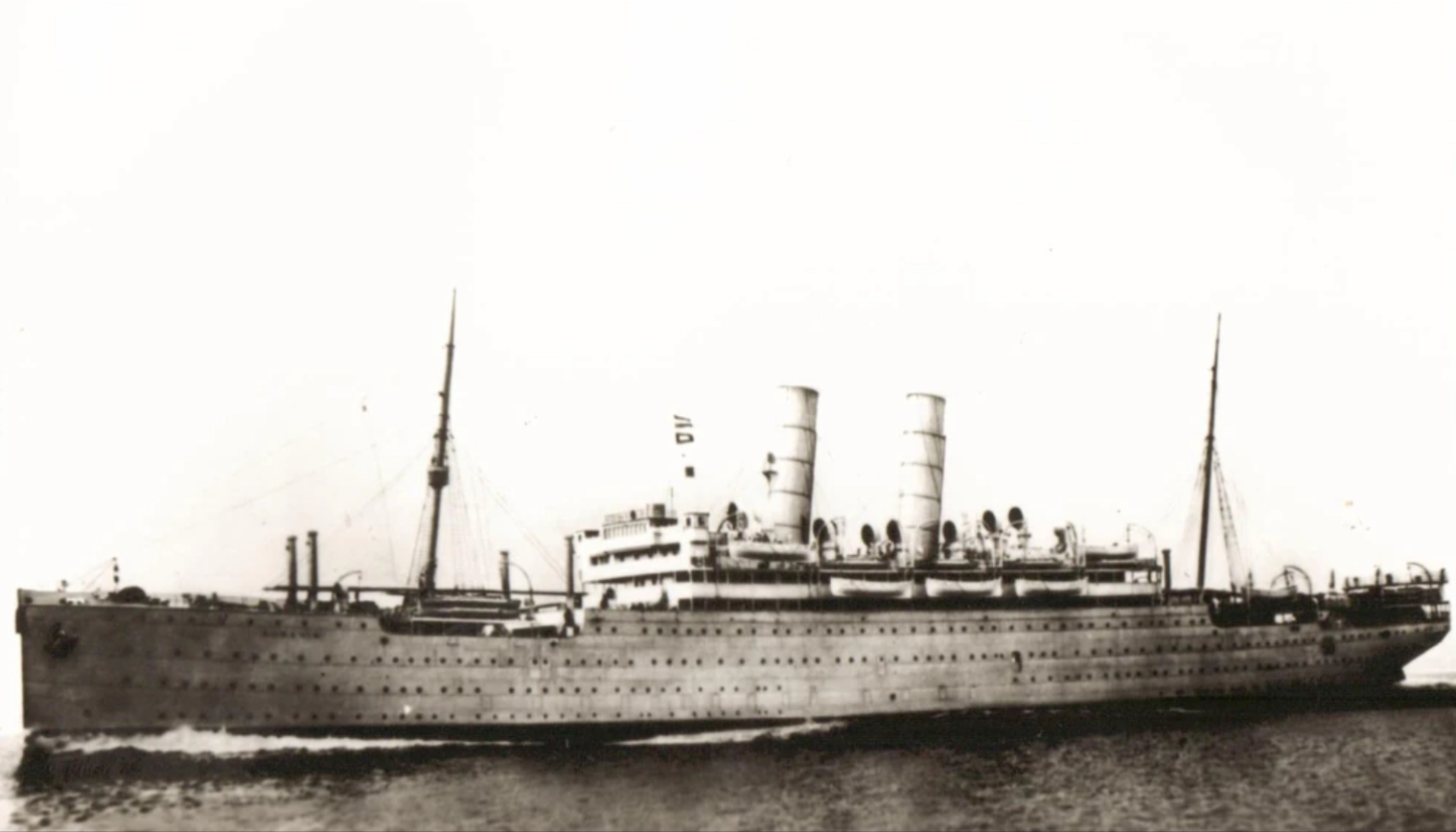
- HMT Aurania underway

History

United Kingdom
- Name: Aurania
- Owner: Cunard Line
- Operator: Cunard Line
- Port of registry: (United Kingdom) Liverpool
- Route: North Atlantic trooping
- Builder: Swan, Hunter & Wigham Richardson, Wallsend-on-Tyne
- Yard number: 965
- Launched: 16 July 1916
- Completed: 19 March 1917
- Acquired: 19 March 1917
- Maiden voyage: 28 March 1917
- In service: 28 March 1917
- Out of service: 4 February 1918
- Home port: Liverpool
- Identification: UK official number 137542
- Fate: Torpedoed, then wrecked in tow, 4 February 1918

General characteristics
- Type: Ocean liner
- Tonnage: 13,936 GRT
- Length: 520.5 ft (158.6 m)
- Beam: 63.5 ft (19.4 m)
- Installed power: 7,500 hp (5.6 MW)
- Propulsion: 2 steam turbines; 2 propellers
- Speed: 15 knots (28 km/h; 17 mph)

RMS Aurania was an ocean liner owned by the Cunard Line. She was built in 1916 at Wallsend and measured 13,936 gross register tons. She spent her entire career operating as a troopship in the First World War and was wrecked in 1918 while under tow following damage from a torpedo attack.

== Construction ==
The Aurania was the last of three ships planned to serve between Canada and Europe. Her sister ships were the Andania and Alaunia. Although ordered in December 1913, her construction was delayed by more pressing government contracts during the First World War, she was not launched until 16 July 1916, after which she was fitted out as a troopship and completed in March 1917.

== Service ==
Aurania made her maiden voyage from the Tyne to New York on 28 March 1917 and on her return sailed to Liverpool. The ship remained on hire to the British Government for the remainder of her career and was used exclusively on the North Atlantic, primarily moving troops and supplies. By February 1918, Aurania had completed seven transatlantic crossings.

== Loss ==
On 3 February 1918, Aurania left Liverpool and was routed around the coast of Northern Ireland, bound for New York. As with many large troopships, she sailed unescorted and relied on her speed to evade potential threats. On the following morning, she was some 15 miles north-west of Inistrahull, off the coast of County Donegal, when she was hit by a torpedo from German submarine UB-67. Nine crew members were killed in the explosion, and the ship lost propulsion after the inflow of water doused her boilers. A trawler took the ship in tow but she became stranded near Tobermory on the Isle of Mull, Scotland. Rough seas soon broke Aurania up and she was declared a total loss.
