= Anna Balazs =

American materials scientist (born 1953)

Anna C. Balazs
- Born: 1953 (age 72–73)
- Education: Bryn Mawr College (AB), Massachusetts Institute of Technology (S.M., PhD)
- Scientific career
- Fields: Computer modeling, soft matter, polymer physics, fluid dynamics
- Workplaces: Massachusetts Institute of Technology, University of Pittsburgh
- Doctoral advisors: K.H. Johnson, George M. Whitesides, Robert J. Silbey
- Website: www.engineering.pitt.edu/ccma

Anna Christina Balazs (born 1953) is an American materials scientist and engineer. She currently is Distinguished Professor at the University of Pittsburgh and holds the John A. Swanson Chair at the Swanson School of Engineering.

Her research involves developing theoretical and computational models to capture the behavior of polymeric materials, nanocomposites and multi-component fluids in confined geometries. In 2016, Balazs was the first woman to receive the Polymer Physics Prize from the American Physical Society “for imaginative and insightful use of theory to understand multi-component polymeric systems.” In 2021 she was elected to the National Academy of Sciences for contributions to computational materials science and in 2022 was elected to the National Academy of Engineering for "creative and imaginative work in predicting the behavior of soft materials that are composed of multiple cooperatively - interacting components."

Balazs is a Fellow of the American Physical Society, the Royal Society of Chemistry, and the Materials Research Society.

== Early life and education ==
Balazs was born to Holocaust survivors in Hungary. Growing up, Balazs' preferred play-thing was plasticine, as it was moldable and can be set into permanent shapes. She also enjoyed entertaining herself with mechanical pencils. She was inspired by her father who was a veterinarian to go into science. Balazs received her B.A. degree with honors in Physics from Bryn Mawr College in 1975. She received her master's and PhD in Materials Science and Engineering from Massachusetts Institute of Technology (MIT), Cambridge, MA in 1981. During her Ph.D. she worked with George M. Whitesides, K.H. Johnson, and Robert J. Silbey. After her Ph.D., she worked as a postdoctoral researcher at Brandeis University (1981-1983) in the Chemistry Department with Irving Epstein. She became a research associate at the University of Massachusetts (1984-1986) in the Polymer Science and Engineering Department with Frank Karasz, William MacKnight, and Isaac Sanchez.

== Research and career ==
In 1987 she moved to the University of Pittsburgh where she became an Assistant Professor (1987-1992), an Associate Professor (1992-1999), and Bicentennial Engineering Alumni Faculty Fellow. Balazs' research combines theoretical and computational modeling of the thermodynamic and kinetic behavior of polymer blends and composites. She has worked on developing models to design regenerating polymer gels. She is the Principal Investigator of the NSF Center for Chemo-Mechanical Assembly (CCMA), established through the National Science Foundation Centers for Chemical Innovation (CCI) Program. She has held the position of visiting professor at Scripps Research Institute in Southern California, the University of Texas at Austin, and Oxford University in the UK.

She was the Chair of the American Physical Society Division of Polymer Physics in 1999-2000. She has also served on the editorial board of Macromolecules, Langmuir, Accounts of Chemical Research, Science Advances, and Soft Matter.

== Awards and achievements ==
- Member of the National Academy of Engineering
- Member of the National Academy of Sciences
- Fellow of the American Physical Society,
- Fellow of the Royal Society of Chemistry
- Fellow of the Materials Research Society,
- 2016 American Physical Society Polymer Physics Prize
- 2015 Royal Society of Chemistry S F Boys-A Rahman Award
- 2014 American Chemical Society Langmuir Lecture Award
- 2013 Mines Medal from the South Dakota School of Mines
- 2003 Maurice Huggins Memorial Award of the Gordon Research Conference for outstanding contributions to Polymer Science
- 1999- 2000 Chair of the American Physical Society Division of Polymer Physics in 1999–2000,
- Special Creativity Prize from the National Science Foundation
