= HMS Ascot =

Minesweeper of the Royal Navy

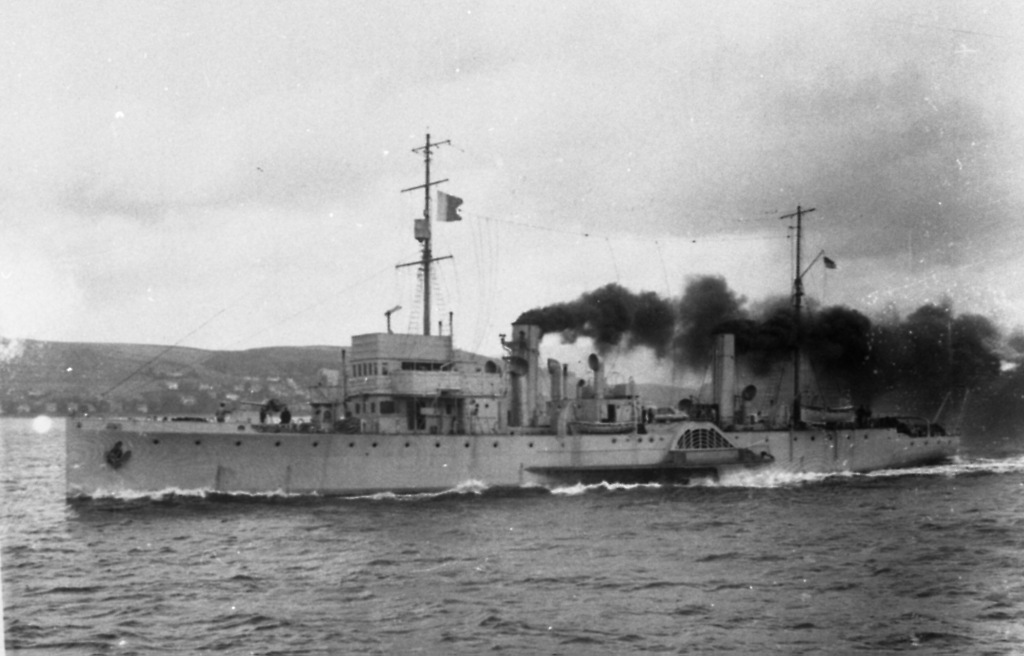

History

United Kingdom
- Name: HMS Ascot
- Builder: Ailsa Shipbuilding Company
- Launched: 26 January 1916
- Fate: Sunk, 10 November 1918

General characteristics
- Class & type: Racecourse-class minesweeper
- Displacement: 810 long tons (820 t)
- Length: 235 ft (72 m)
- Beam: 29 ft (8.8 m); 58 ft (18 m) at the paddles
- Draught: 6 ft 9 in (2.06 m)
- Installed power: 1,400 ihp (1,000 kW)
- Propulsion: Inclined compound; cylindrical return tube
- Speed: 15 kn (17 mph; 28 km/h)
- Capacity: 156 long tons (159 t) coal
- Complement: 50
- Armament: 2 × 12-pounder guns

HMS Ascot was a Racecourse-class minesweeper of the Royal Navy. The Racecourse class comprised 32 paddlewheel coastal minesweeping sloops.

Ascot was the last ship to be sunk in the First World War on 10 November 1918, the day before the announcement of the armistice. She was torpedoed by UB-67 off the Farne Islands.

The wreckage lies at a depth of 60 metres (200 ft), at 55°37′9.24″N 001°29′8.60″W.
