= Swanson School of Engineering =

Engineering school of the University of Pittsburgh

Coordinates: 40.443811°N 79.958488°W

- Type: Public
- Established: 1846; 180 years ago
- Dean: Michele V. Manuel
- Faculty: 230 (tenure and non-tenure)
- Undergraduates: 2,622
- Postgraduates: 816
- Location: Pittsburgh, Pennsylvania, US
- Campus: Oakland
- Endowment: $197.2 million (2016)
- Website: www.engineering.pitt.edu

The Swanson School of Engineering is the engineering school of the University of Pittsburgh in Pittsburgh, Pennsylvania. Founded in 1846, the Swanson School of Engineering is the second or third oldest in the United States.

== History ==
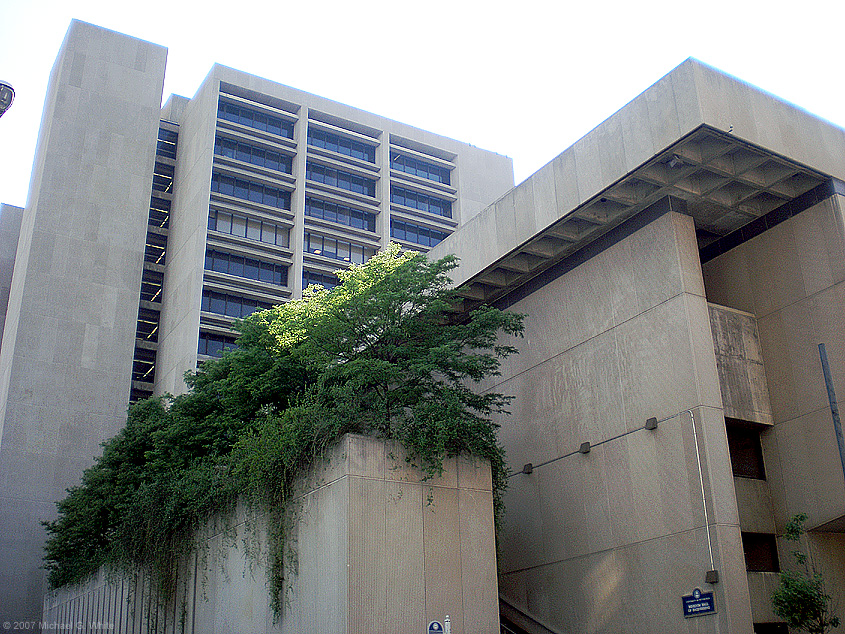
Benedum Hall and the Engineering Auditorium (in the foreground) is the primary home of the Swanson School of Engineering at the University of Pittsburgh.

The Swanson School of Engineering evolved out of the Western University of Pennsylvania, the former name of the University of Pittsburgh, offering specialized engineering subjects to students, although they were still required to complete their classical requirements. The first graduates in these engineering subjects were Isaac Morley and J. B. Stilly in 1846. Separate degree programs in mechanical and civil engineering were announced in 1868, and four year degrees resulting in separate engineering degrees were first implemented in 1870. The school was the university's response to the years surrounding the Civil War that transformed Pittsburgh's industrial base from regional to international.

Degrees in civil engineering and mechanical engineering were offered beginning in 1868. Mining engineering was added in 1869 and Electrical Engineering in 1890. In 1909, the metallurgical engineering department was established, followed by the chemical engineering department and the world's first petroleum engineering department in 1910, with its first degree conferred in 1915. The undergraduate cooperative education program was also initiated that year. The industrial engineering department was established in 1921 and the safety engineering program in 1930. The bioengineering department was added in 1998.

In 2007 the school was renamed to the Swanson School of Engineering after John A. Swanson, founder of the computer software firm ANSYS, donated $41.3 million to the school.

== Academics ==
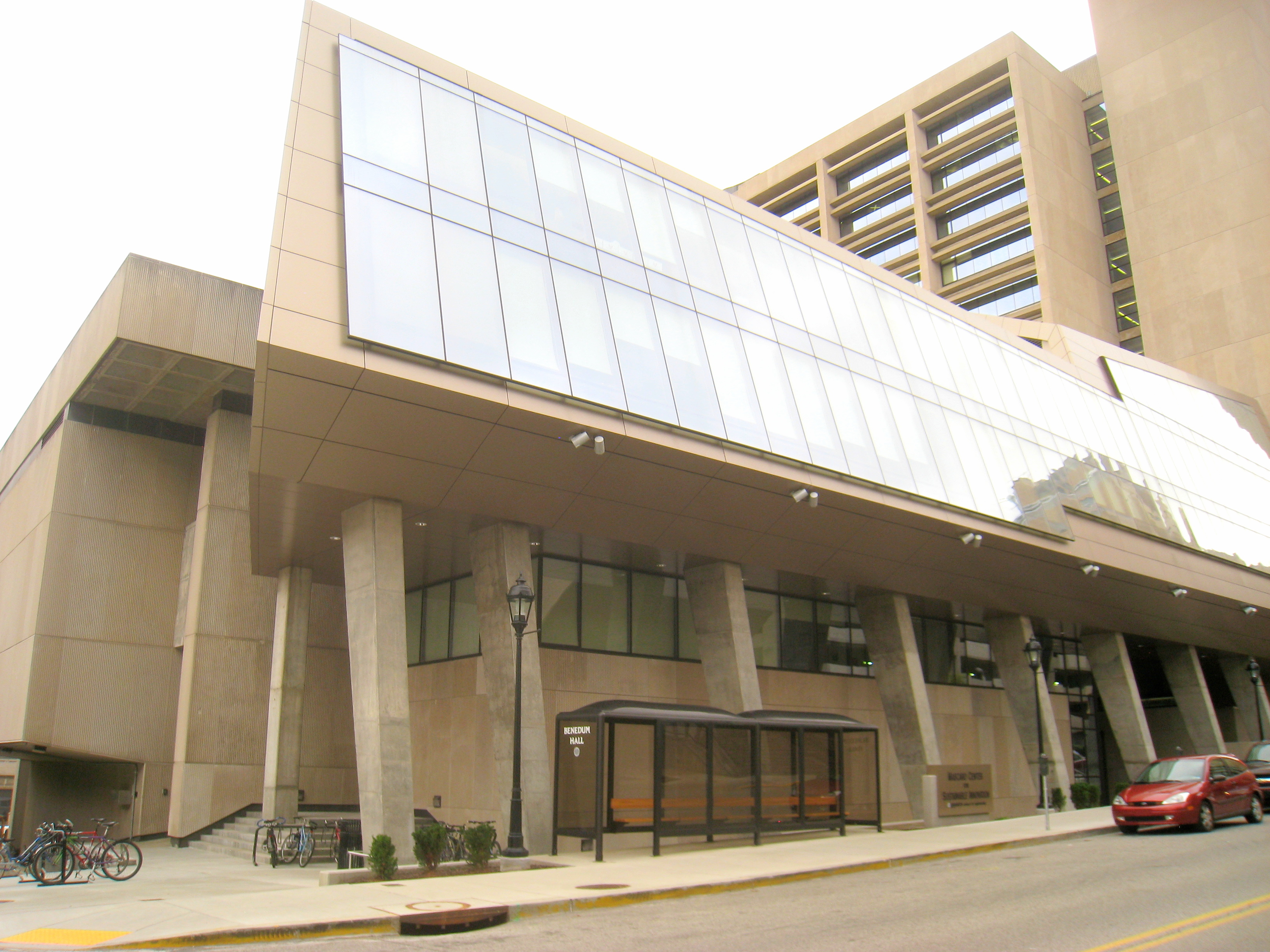
The Mascaro Center for Sustainable Innovation is attached to Benedum Hall

The Swanson School of Engineering offers undergraduate, graduate degrees, and doctorates in 6 academic departments:

- Bioengineering
- Chemical and petroleum engineering
- Civil and environmental engineering
- Electrical and computer engineering
- Industrial engineering
- Mechanical engineering and materials science

Academic programs offered by the school include bioengineering, chemical engineering, petroleum engineering, civil engineering, mining engineering, computer engineering, electrical engineering, engineering science, industrial engineering, materials science and engineering, mechanical engineering, and nuclear engineering.

Research centers housed in the school include:

- The Center for Energy
- The Center for Research Computing
- The Mascaro Center for Sustainable Innovation
- The Petersen Institute for Nanoscience and Engineering
- The Lubrizol Innovation Laboratory (a partnership of the Chemical and Petroleum Engineering Department and Lubrizol)

== Center for Energy ==
The University of Pittsburgh Center for Energy is a research center housed in the Swanson School of Engineering that is dedicated to improving energy technology development and energy sustainability. Comprising more than 70 faculty members and 200 students and postdocs, the center was scheduled to be housed on a floor of Benedum Hall undergoing a $15 million renovation. The center was created in 2008 to bring together energy innovators across a range of engineering and academic disciplines. It also sought to develop stronger collaborations with energy industry partners in the Western Pennsylvania. The center's faculty focus on five key areas of research that include energy delivery and reliability, carbon management and utilization, high-temperature and other advanced materials, energy efficiency, and unconventional gas resources.

== Mascaro Center for Sustainable Innovation ==
In 2003, through funding from Jack Mascaro, the Heinz Endowments, and the George Bevier Estate, the Swanson School of Engineering established the Mascaro Sustainability Initiative, resulting in the Mascaro Center for Sustainable Innovation (MCSI).

== Deans ==
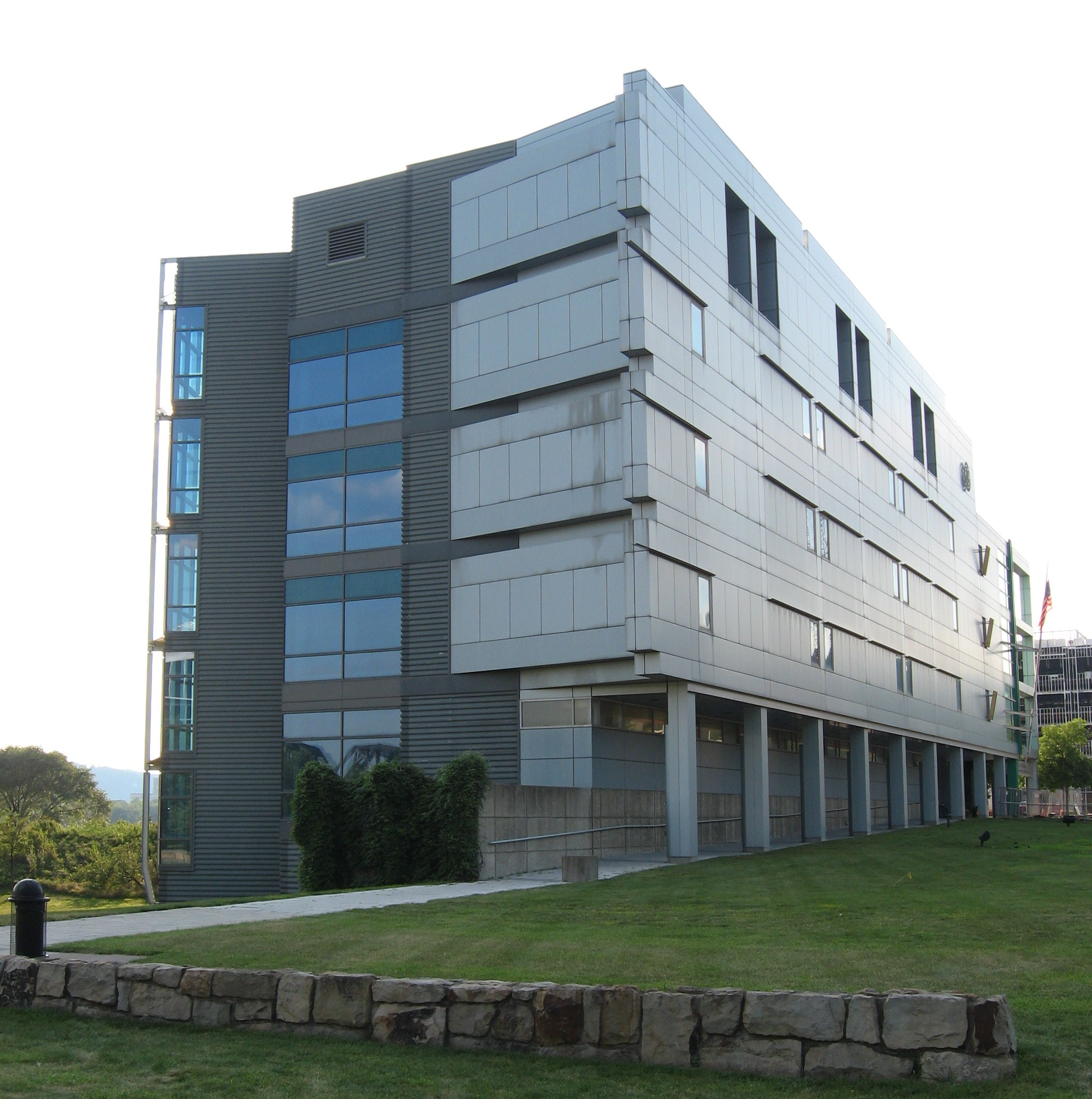
The Center for Biotechnology and Bioengineering is the home of the Swanson School's Department of Bioengineering

Ten individuals have served in the position of the Dean of the School of Engineering over its history.

Deans of the Swanson School of Engineering
| Years | Dean |
| 1882–1908 | Daniel Carhart |
| 1910–1927 | Frederick L. Bishop |
| 1927–1950 | Elmer A. Holbrook |
| 1951–1963 | G. Raymond Fitterer |
| 1965–1973 | Harold E. Hoelscher |
| 1973–1985 | Max L. Williams |
| 1986–1993 | Charles A. Sorber |
| 1994–1996 | H.K. Chang |
| 1996–2018 | Gerald D. Holder |
| 2018–2022 | James R. Martin II |
| 2022–2024 | Sanjeev Shroff (interim) |
| 2024– | Michele V. Manuel |

== Current Department Chairs ==
- Bioengineering - Sanjeev Shroff
- Chemical and Petroleum - Steven R. Little
- Civil and Environmental - Vikas Khanna (interim)
- Electrical and Computer - Alan D. George
- Industrial - Lisa Maillart (interim)
- Mechanical and Materials Science - Brian Gleeson

== Current Associate Deans ==
- Academic Affairs - Mary Besterfield-Sacre
- Faculty Excellence - Anne Robertson
- Graduate Education - Robert Parker
- International Initiatives - Minking Chyu
- Research - David Vorp
- Strategic Initiatives - Heng Ban

== Notable alumni and faculty ==
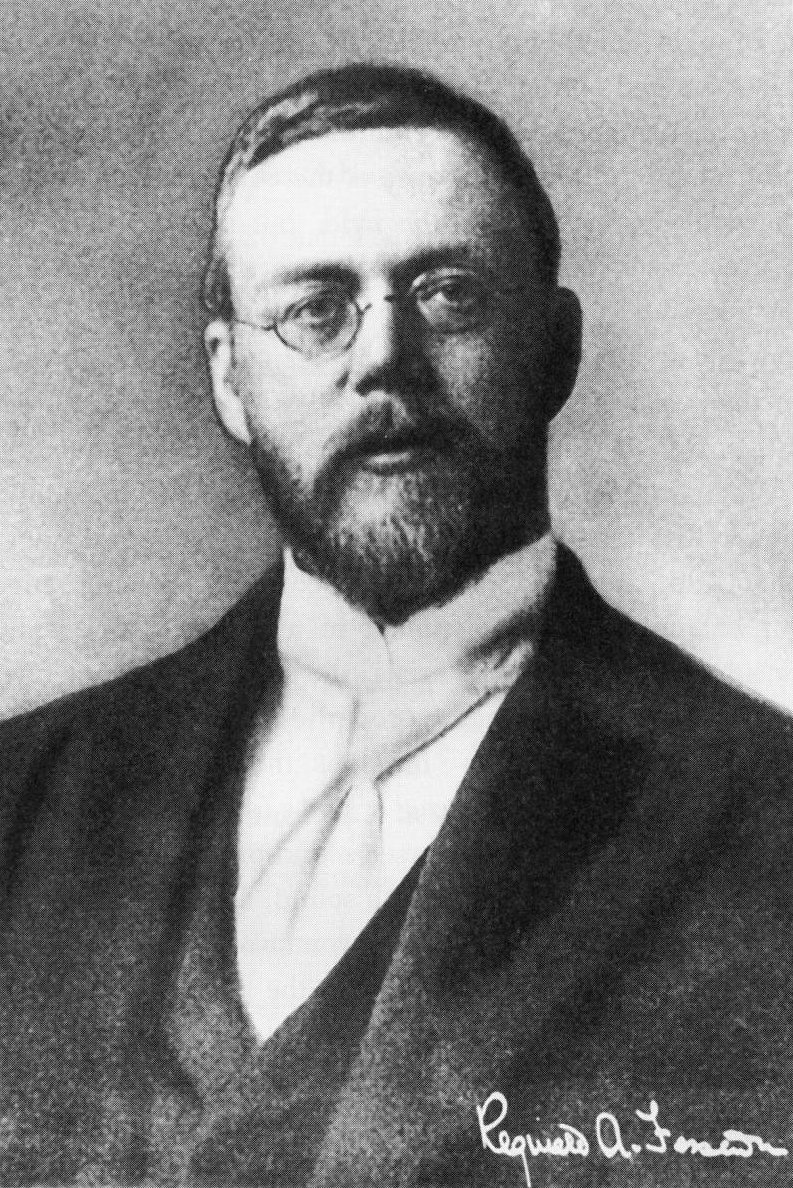
Reginald Fessenden helped to pioneer wireless communications while at Pitt

- Wanda Austin, PhD (MSCE ′77, MS Math ′77) – retired president and CEO, The Aerospace Corporation and interim president of University of Southern California
- Anna Balazs (faculty) - Distinguished Professor and John A. Swanson Chair of Chemical and Petroleum Engineering, member of the National Academy of Sciences
- Donna Blackmond, PhD (BSCHE '80, MSCHE '81) – professor of chemistry, The Scripps Research Institute and member of the National Academy of Engineering
- Erik Buell (BSMechE '79) - founder, former chairman and Chief Technical Officer of the Buell Motorcycle Company and founder of Erik Buell Racing
- John Choma (BAS ′63 BSEE ′64, MSEE ′65, PhD ′69) – professor and chair of electrical engineering-Electrophysics at the University of Southern California
- Bob Colwell (BSEE ′77) – electrical engineer who was the chief architect on the Pentium Pro, Pentium II, Pentium III, and Pentium 4 microprocessors
- William Hunter Dammond (BSCE 1893) - first African-American graduate of the university and inventor of railroad safety systems
- Reginald Fessenden (faculty) – inventor and sonar pioneer who developed insulation for electrical wires, built first wireless telephone, and transmitted the first audio radio broadcast
- Joseph A. Hardy III (1948) – Founder and CEO of 84 Lumber and Nemacolin Woodlands Resort.
- Michael Lovell (BSME ′89, MSME ′91, PhD ′94) – president of Marquette University
- Jay Nunamaker, PhD (BSME ′60, MSIE ′66) – Regents and Soldwedel Professor of MIS, Computer Science and Communications, University of Arizona
- John A. Swanson (PhD ′66) – founder of the computer software firm ANSYS, Inc., member of the National Academy of Engineering, and recipient of the John Fritz Medal
- Bryan Salesky (BSCoE '02) - founder and CEO of Argo AI
- Savio L-Y Woo (faculty) - Distinguished University Professor and recipient of the 1998 Olympic gold medal for Sports Science

== See also ==
- Department of Industrial Engineering's Manufacturing Assistance Center
