= HMS Chelmsford =

Minesweeper of the Royal Navy

History

United Kingdom
- Name: HMS Chelmsford
- Namesake: Chelmsford, Essex
- Builder: Ailsa Shipbuilding Company
- Launched: 14 June 1916
- Fate: Sold to Hughes Bolckow, Blyth on 25 November 1927

General characteristics
- Class & type: Racecourse-class minesweeper
- Displacement: 810 tons
- Length: 235 ft (72 m)
- Beam: 29 ft (8.8 m) (58 ft (18 m) feet at the paddles)
- Draught: 6.75 ft (2.06 m)
- Propulsion: Designed 1,400 hp (1,000 kW). Inclined compound. Cylindrical return tube.
- Speed: max 15 knots (28 km/h; 17 mph)
- Range: 156 tons coal
- Complement: 50 men
- Armament: 2 × 12-pounder guns

HMS Chelmsford was a Racecourse-class minesweeper of the Royal Navy built in 1916. The Racecourse class (also called the Ascot class) comprised 32 paddlewheel coastal minesweeping sloops. The ship was named after Chelmsford in Essex.
