= HMS Chepstow =

Minesweeper of the Royal Navy

History

United Kingdom
- Name: HMS Chepstow
- Namesake: Chepstow, Monmouthshire
- Builder: Ayrshire Dockyard Co
- Launched: 29 February 1916
- Fate: Sold to Hughes Bolckow, Blyth, 25 November 1927

General characteristics
- Class & type: Racecourse-class minesweeper
- Displacement: 810 tons
- Length: 235 ft (72 m)
- Beam: 29 ft (8.8 m) (58 ft (18 m) at the paddles)
- Draught: 6.75 ft (2.06 m)
- Propulsion: Designed 1,400 hp (1,000 kW). Inclined compound. Cylindrical return tube.
- Speed: max 15 knots (28 km/h)
- Range: 156 tons coal
- Complement: 50 men
- Armament: 2 × 12-pounder

HMS Chepstow was a Racecourse-class minesweeper of the Royal Navy built in 1916. The Racecourse Class (also called the Ascot Class) comprised 32 paddlewheel coastal minesweeping sloops. The vessel was named for Chepstow Racecourse.

The ship's bell is in St. Mary's Church, Chepstow.

== See also ==
- HMS Chepstow Castle, a corvette cancelled in 1943
