= David Vorp =

American bioengineer

David A. Vorp
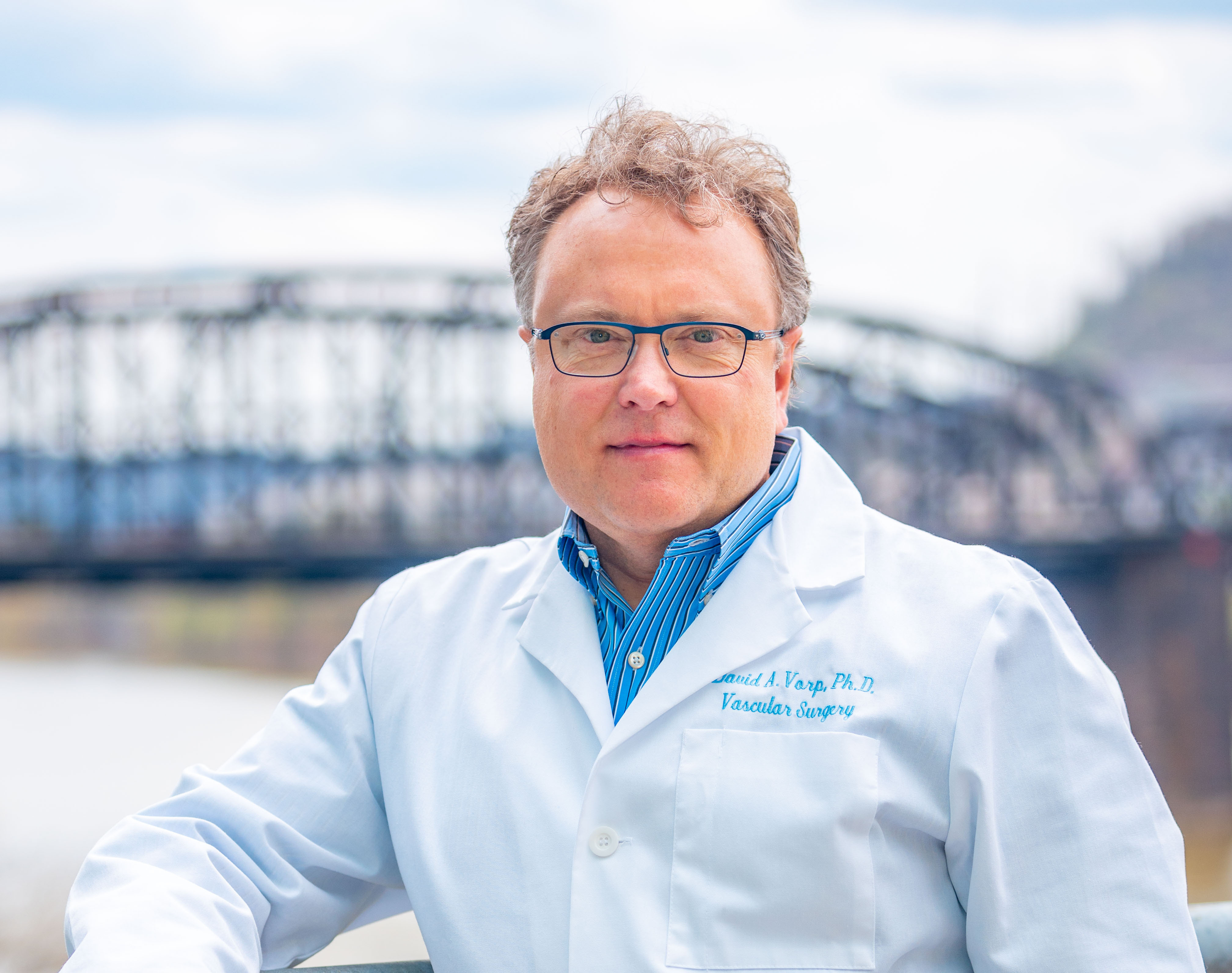
- David A. Vorp
- Born: July 29, 1964 (age 62)
- Education: University of Pittsburgh (BS, PhD)
- Scientific career
- Fields: Aortic aneurysms, biomechanics, tissue engineering, vascular grafts, regenerative medicine
- Workplaces: University of Pittsburgh
- Doctoral advisor: K. R. Rajagopal
- Website: www.engineering.pitt.edu/vorplab/

David A. Vorp (born July 29, 1964) is an American bioengineer, researcher, entrepreneur, and academic administrator noted for his contributions to aortic aneurysm biomechanics and pathobiology, and tissue engineered vascular grafts. He currently holds the titles of Associate Dean for Research at the University of Pittsburgh Swanson School of Engineering and the John A. Swanson Professor of Bioengineering, with secondary appointments in the departments of Cardiothoracic Surgery, Surgery, Chemical & Petroleum Engineering, and the Clinical & Translational Sciences Institute at the University of Pittsburgh. He also serves as the co-director of the Center for Medical Innovation., the acting director of the university's GRID Institute, and the director of the Vascular Bioengineering Laboratory.

== Education ==
Vorp received his BS and PhD in mechanical engineering, in 1986 and 1992, respectively, from the University of Pittsburgh. His dissertation, under advisor K. R. Rajagopal, was “Finite element modelling and analyses of nonlinearly elastic, orthotropic, vascular tissue in distension.”

== Research ==
After receiving his PhD in 1992, Vorp joined the University of Pittsburgh School of Medicine, Department of Surgery, as research assistant professor, and later promoted to assistant professor in 1997, associate professor with tenure in 2003, and full professor in 2008. In 1996 he was appointed as one of the core faculty of the Swanson School's new Department of Bioengineering, and in 2011 moved his primary faculty appointment to that department, keeping secondary appointments in the School of Medicine. In 2012 he became associate dean for research for the Swanson School.

He is the principal investigator of the Vascular Bioengineering Laboratory, located at the University of Pittsburgh Center for Bioengineering in the Pittsburgh Technology Center.

== Awards and honors ==
Vorp was elected as a Fellow of the American Heart Association in 2018, American Society of Mechanical Engineers in 2010, Biomedical Engineering Society in 2008, and the American Institute for Medical & Biological Engineers in 2005.

In 2011 he received the Van C. Mow Medal from ASME, which recognizes “demonstrated meritorious contributions to the field of bioengineering through research, education, professional development, leadership in the development of the profession, mentorship to young bioengineers, and with service to the bioengineering community.”

In 2012, he became the first non-MD President of the International Society for Applied Cardiovascular Biology and was re-elected for a second term in 2014. His other executive roles include ASME Bioengineering Division Chair from 2013 to 2014, two terms on the BMES Board of Directors, and two terms as BMES Secretary.

- Elected Founding President of SB3C Foundation (2015)
- Elected to the World Council of Biomechanics (2014, limited to 40 members worldwide)
- Carnegie Science Award for Life Sciences (2013)
- Swanson School of Engineering Board of Visitors Faculty Award (2012)
- Van C. Mow Medal, ASME (2011)
- University of Pittsburgh Innovator Award (2009, 2010, in recognition of innovation development efforts that have resulted in licenses to industry and start-up companies in the past year)
- Distinguished Lecturer, Columbia University, Department of Biomedical Engineering (2009)

== Humanitarian causes ==
Vorp serves on the board of directors for Big World Project, an organization whose mission is to rescue and care for street children around the world.
