= HMS Melton =

Minesweeper of the Royal Navy

History

United Kingdom
- Name: HMS Melton
- Namesake: Melton Racecourse, Leicestershire
- Builder: William Hamilton & Company
- Launched: March 1916
- Fate: Sold into civilian service in 1927

United Kingdom
- Name: Queen of Thanet
- Owner: New Medway Steam Packet Co.
- Acquired: 1929
- Fate: Requisitioned by Admiralty 1939

United Kingdom
- Name: HMS Queen of Thanet
- Commissioned: 1939
- Decommissioned: 1946
- Fate: Released back to civilian service

United Kingdom
- Name: Queen of Thanet (1946 - 1949); Solent Queen (1949 - 1951)
- Owner: New Medway Steam Packet Co.; Red Funnel
- Fate: Scrapped after fire in 1951

General characteristics
- Class & type: Racecourse-class minesweeper
- Displacement: 810 long tons (823 t)
- Length: 235 ft (72 m)
- Beam: 29 ft (8.8 m); 58 ft (18 m) at the paddles
- Draught: 6.75–7 ft (2.06–2.13 m)
- Propulsion: Inclined compound. Cylindrical return tube. 1,400 hp.
- Speed: 15 knots (17 mph; 28 km/h)
- Range: 156 tons coal
- Complement: 50–52 men
- Armament: 2 × 12-pounder guns

HMS Melton was a Racecourse-class minesweeper of the Royal Navy. The Racecourse class comprised 32 paddlewheel coastal minesweeping sloops.

She returned to active service in World War II as HMS Queen of Thanet (J30).

== History ==
=== Great War ===
Built by William Hamilton & Company in Port Glasgow, Scotland, Melton was launched in March 1916 with the pennant number 898. As built she was equipped to operate two seaplanes but never did so. For the rest of World War I she served with the Auxiliary Patrol. Post-war she was transferred to the Mine Clearance Service.

=== Between the wars ===
Melton was sold to Hughes Bolckow in 1927. She was bought by The New Medway Steam Packet Company in 1929 and converted for excursion work on the River Medway and River Thames. She was renamed Queen of Thanet. For the next twelve years she could be found working from Sheerness and Southend. Regular excursions took her to Gravesend, Margate, Clacton and Dover as well as across the English Channel to Calais, Boulogne and Dunkirk.

=== World War II ===
In September 1939 she was requisitioned by the Admiralty for minesweeping duties once more and commissioned as HMS Queen of Thanet, pennant number J30. In May 1940 she took part in the Dunkirk evacuation rescuing 4,000 men in four trips. Of that number, 2,000 were transferred from the ex-LNER steamer Prague, after the latter had been damaged by near misses from shells and dive bombers off Gravelines. For Operation Overlord in June 1944 she was stationed at Selsey as the Mulberry Despatch Control Ship. After the war she was returned in 1946 to her owners to recommence excursion work around the Thames Estuary.

=== Post War ===
In January 1949 she was sold to Red Funnel and transferred to Southampton. After refitting at Thorneycroft's yard at Northam she was commissioned in the spring as the company's second Solent Queen. For the next two years she operated excursions from Southampton in the summer. In June 1951 while slipped for survey and repair, she caught fire and was written off as a constructive loss. She was scrapped by Dover Industries at Dover Eastern Docks in 1951.
