= University of Pittsburgh Applied Research Center =

Research and industrial complex in Harmar Township, Pennsylvania

Coordinates: 40.544781°N 79.829711°W

University of Pittsburgh Applied Research Center

The University of Pittsburgh Applied Research Center (U-PARC) was a one-million-square foot (93,000 m^{2}), high-security research park campus of the University of Pittsburgh. Comprising 53 buildings situated on over 85 acres (0.34 km^{2}), U-PARC is located 14 miles (23 km) from Downtown Pittsburgh in Harmar Township, Pennsylvania adjacent to the Route 28 expressway and Interstate 76, the Pennsylvania Turnpike.

It was founded as the research laboratories of Gulf Oil in 1933 and moved to Harmar Township in 1935. It served many decades as one of the leading industrial research centers in the world, with labs engaging in petroleum, chemical, polymer, refining, and nuclear research. At its peak, it employed over 2,000 scientists and engineers and had an annual budget of $100 million ($299 million in 2025 dollars). Upon Gulf Oil's acquisition by Chevron Oil in 1985, the research park was donated to the University of Pittsburgh in order to keep the center open for the benefit of the region.

U-PARC was at one time home to more than 100 different companies from around the world, including several Fortune 500 Companies. In addition, the university's Swanson School of Engineering maintains laboratories and its Manufacturing Assistance Center at the site. It also serves as the home to the School of Health and Rehabilitation Sciences' Masters of Science program in Physician Assistant Studies.

The university sold the property in 2024.

== History ==
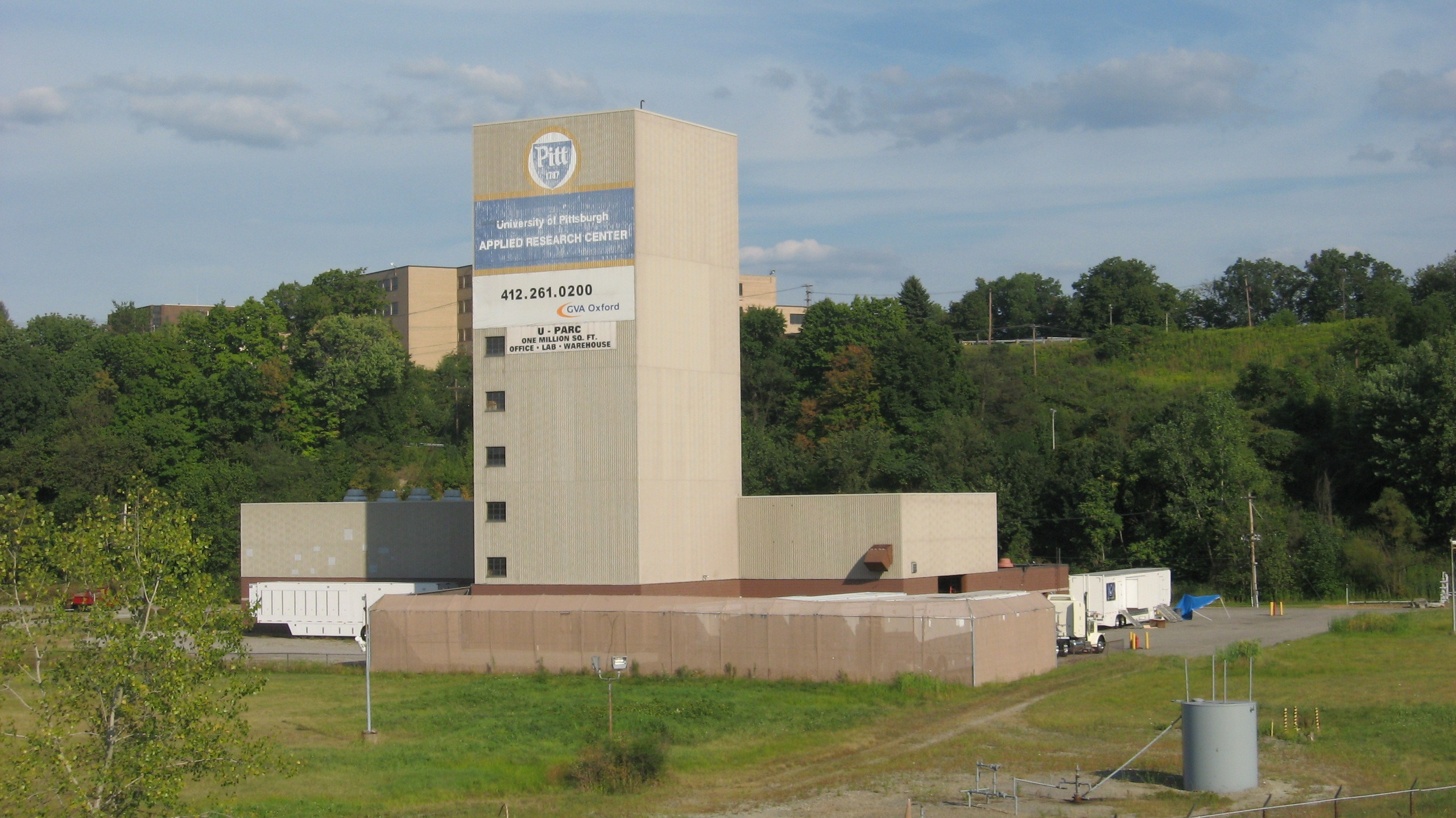
One of 53 U-PARC buildings as seen from outside the campus

U-PARC was founded as the research labs of Gulf Oil in 1933 in the Oakland section of Pittsburgh. Work began on its current Harmar Township location in August 1934 with the opening of the first three buildings in 1935. For many decades it was one of the leading industrial research centers in the world, with labs encompassing research ranging from petroleum, chemical, polymers, refining to even nuclear applications thanks to a three million volt Van de Graaff particle accelerator. It also served for a time as the site of geophysics research by John Bardeen, before he turned to solid state physics and won the Nobel Prize in Physics twice. Products developed in its labs included the airborne magnetometer, the marsh buggy, No-Nox gasoline, Gulf Spray pesticide, and processes for the hydrodesulfurization of sour crude oil and shale oil extraction. For at least the first 20 years of its existence it was the "most highly integrated of all the petroleum research laboratories in the world". By 1955, it employed over 1,200, and by the late 1970s, it employed 1,500. General Matthew Ridgway keynoted the dedication of three new research laboratories at the center in May, 1957 with Richard King Mellon and about 600 others in attendance. In 1985 Gulf Oil was acquired by Chevron Corporation which maintained its own research facilities in Richmond, California, the complex had grown to 85 acres (340,000 m^{2}) with 54 multi-story lab buildings and employed nearly 2,000 scientists and engineers with an annual operation budget of over $100 million. The University of Pittsburgh proposed that it would be able to maintain and operate the facility in order to keep the center open for the benefit of the region. Gulf and Chevron agreed to the university's proposal and donated the site, valued at $100 million including the fully furnished and equipped laboratories, a computer telecommunications center, an executive office building, and unique facilities such as large cold room containing a wind tunnel. Chevron also added a $3 million start up grant, and the Commonwealth of Pennsylvania added a $3 million matching grant for economic development. The donation was announced by university Chancellor Wesley Posvar at a press conference in April, 1985. The university took over the facility in early 1986 and renamed it the University of Pittsburgh Applied Research Center. On March 17, 1986, the university signed its first major tenant, General Motors Corporation, to a four-year, $13 million contract and in two years was sheltering 80 small businesses.

U-PARC was home to academic programs and to more than 100 companies from all over the world, including several Fortune 500 companies. U-PARC's pilot plant services range from petroleum, petrochemical, and chemical-based technologies to environmental, synthetic fuels, biotechnology, and other emerging technologies. Buildings are connected indoors throughout the campus via tunnels. On-site amenities include 24-hour monitored access points, free parking, catering service, meeting/conference space, a U.S. Postal Service sub-station, a credit union, ATMs, picnic areas, outdoor dining, volleyball courts, locker rooms, and shower facilities.

In addition to the companies that occupied the facilities at U-PARC, the University of Pittsburgh's Swanson School of Engineering maintained research groups and laboratories at the site, including the Manufacturing Assistance Center. Beginning in 2010, the University of Pittsburgh School of Health and Rehabilitation Sciences initiated a Masters of Science program in Physician Assistant Studies headquartered at U-PARC. The space for the Physician's Assistant program includes classrooms, breakout rooms, student lounge, computer room, conference room and offices for faculty and administration.

== Manufacturing Assistance Center ==
The Manufacturing Assistance Center (MAC), located in Building A-11 of U-PARC, is a working factory opened in November 1994 as an initiative of the University of Pittsburgh's Swanson School of Engineering's Department of Industrial Engineering that offers technical assistance and educational resources to the academic and industrial community of Western Pennsylvania. It also serves as an incubator for manufacturing innovation and as a center for technology transfer. The MAC provides access to advanced manufacturing technology, encourages its adoption, and assists in training and educating students in its use. The center comprises a synergistic network of laboratories encompassing machine tooling, computer-aided design and manufacturing, metrology, materials tracking, and human issues.

The MAC began following a 1990 survey of 550 Western Pennsylvania manufacturers by the Department of Industrial Engineering that revealed the need for manufacturing support services in this part of the state. In response a concept of shared manufacturing was created by Pitt School of Engineering professors Dr. Bopaya Bidanda and Dr. David I. Cleland, and a proposal describing how the MAC would meet this need resulted in a $2.3 million grant from the Economic Development Administration of the U.S. Department of Commerce. The center's purpose is to provide research and educational support to the University of Pittsburgh, as well as to provide small and mid-sized manufacturers of Western Pennsylvania with the tools to compete in the global marketplace. As such, area manufacturers can receive demonstrations on new equipment and manufacturing processes, perform pilot manufacturing, and conduct limited production utilizing the resources available in the MAC labs. In addition to these services, the MAC also provides training on computer numerical control (CNC) machining, computer-aided design (CAD), computer-aided manufacturing (CAM), and computer-integrated manufacturing (CIM), plus a variety of other concepts, such as materials requirements planning, total quality management, and team development, that are utilized by modern manufacturing organizations. Working in partnership with private industry, the MAC is part of the development of the regional RoboCorridor, promoting automation and agile robotics.

The MAC's 40,000 square feet (3,700 m^{2}) of available space contains a working factory, classrooms, and administration offices and supplies secure space for startup companies wishing to access its facilities. The factory has a 5-ton and a 1-ton overhead crane, a loading dock, 220 and 480 volt 3-phase power, a paint room, and welding booths. The space is subdivided into classrooms, a conference room, a computer laboratory designed for CAD/CAM training, offices and training areas for manual, welding training, and CNC and EDM machine tool and precision grinding training. The facility also includes two classrooms seating 24 and 12 students, respectively, as well as five offices, a metrology lab, and a computer lab. There are five additional rooms available on the basement floor for offices, storage, a small production setup area, along with a test facility with a garage entrance and access to a 1-ton overhead crane.
