= HMS Croxton =

Minesweeper of the Royal Navy

History

United Kingdom
- Name: HMS Croxton
- Namesake: Croxton Kerrial, Leicestershire
- Builder: Ayrshire Dockyard Co
- Launched: 7 April 1916
- Fate: Sold March 1922 to Ward, Inverkeithing

General characteristics
- Class & type: Racecourse-class minesweeper
- Displacement: 810 tons
- Length: 235 ft (72 m)
- Beam: 29 ft (8.8 m) (58 ft (18 m) at the paddles)
- Draught: 6.75 ft (2.06 m)
- Propulsion: Designed 1,400 hp (1,000 kW). Inclined compound. Cylindrical return tube.
- Speed: max 15 knots (28 km/h; 17 mph)
- Range: 156 tons coal
- Complement: 50 men
- Armament: 2 × 12-pounder

HMS Croxton was a Racecourse-class minesweeper of the Royal Navy built in 1916. The Racecourse class (also called the Ascot class) comprised 32 paddlewheel coastal minesweeping sloops.
