= K. R. Rajagopal =

Indian-American mechanical engineering professor (1950–2025)

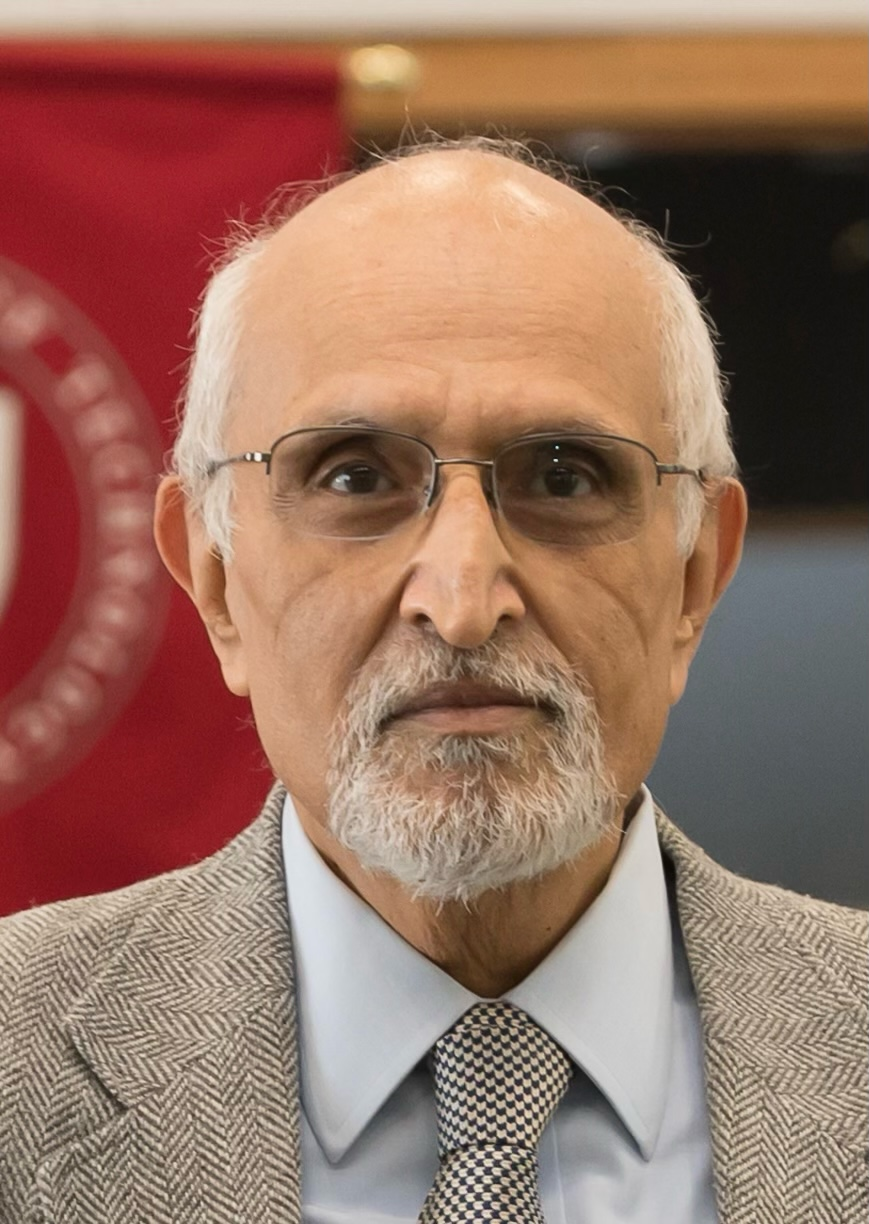
- K. R. Rajagopal
- Born: Kumbakonam Ramamani Rajagopal; November 24, 1950; Delhi, India
- Died: March 20, 2025 (aged 74); Philadelphia, Pennsylvania, United States
- Education: Indian Institute of Technology, Madras (B.Tech., 1973); Illinois Institute of Technology (M.S., 1974)
- Alma mater: University of Minnesota (Ph.D., 1978)
- Notable work: An Introduction to the Mechanics of Fluids (2000)
- Spouse: Chandrika Iyengar
- Father: K. R. Ramamani
- Awards: Eringen Medal (2004, Society of Engineering Science); Werner Medal (2022, ASME); Genesis Award (2024, Texas A&M University)
- Scientific career
- Fields: Continuum mechanics; Non-Newtonian fluid mechanics; Rheology
- Institutions: Texas A&M University; University of Pittsburgh; University of Michigan; Catholic University of America
- Doctoral students: David Vorp

Kumbakonam Ramamani Rajagopal (November 24, 1950 – March 20, 2025), also known as K. R. Rajagopal or Kumbakonam R. Rajagopal, was an Indian-American mechanical engineer, applied mathematician, and academic known for his work in continuum mechanics, rheology, and non-Newtonian fluid mechanics. He held several academic positions across various disciplines, including mechanical engineering, mathematics, and biomedical engineering.

== Early life and education ==
Rajagopal was born in Delhi, India, on November 24, 1950. His mother's father, V. S. Sundaram, was a Government Civil Servant who authored the first book on Indian taxation laws, titled The Law of Income Tax in India. His father, K. R. Ramamani, was a prominent tax lawyer in Chennai. He received a B.Tech. in Mechanical Engineering from the Indian Institute of Technology, Madras in 1973. He completed his M.S. in Aerospace and Mechanical Engineering from the Illinois Institute of Technology in 1974 and received his Ph.D. in mechanics from the University of Minnesota in 1978.

== Academic and professional career ==
From 1978 to 1980, he served as a postdoctoral lecturer and fellow at the University of Michigan. He was appointed assistant professor at the Catholic University of America in 1980.

From 1982 to 1995, Rajagopal was a faculty member at the University of Pittsburgh, serving in different roles across the Departments of Mechanical Engineering, Mathematics, and Surgery. He held the James T. MacLeod Professorship and received the President's Distinguished Research Award in 1991.

In 1996, he joined Texas A&M University as the Forsyth Chairman and Professor in Mechanical Engineering. He later held appointments in several other departments, including Biomedical Engineering, Chemical Engineering, Civil Engineering, Mathematics, and Ocean Engineering. In 2003, he was named University Distinguished Professor, and in 2008, he was appointed Regents Professor. He collaborated with Clifford Truesdell to write the textbook An Introduction to the Mechanics of Fluids (2000).

Rajagopal also held honorary and adjunct positions at several institutions worldwide, including Charles University (Czech Republic), the University of Pretoria (South Africa), and the University of Witwatersrand (South Africa), and IIT Madras (India).

== Research ==
Rajagopal focused on several areas within continuum mechanics and related fields. As noted by Gerald Maugin, he "...left a definite imprint on so many fields of continuum mechanics, including non-Newtonian fluids, theory of mixtures..., mechanics of polymers..., thermomechanics in general, phase transitions, granular materials, biomechanics, and electrorheological materials....” Some of his research work in collaboration with a number of colleagues include:

Continuum mechanics and non-Newtonian fluids

Rajagopal contributed to the study of non-Newtonian fluids, focusing on materials whose viscosity changes with applied stress. His work included developing constitutive models to describe the behavior of such fluids, including shear-thinning and viscoelastic materials. He also investigated the flow of non-Newtonian fluids between rotating disks, providing insights into their rheological properties.

Thermodynamic frameworks

He developed thermodynamic frameworks for rate-type fluid models, particularly for viscoelastic fluids lacking instantaneous elasticity. These models aimed to capture the creep and stress relaxation behaviors observed in such materials.

Electrorheological materials

Rajagopal explored the mathematical modeling of electrorheological materials, which exhibit changes in rheological properties under electric fields. His work provided a theoretical basis for understanding the behavior of these materials under different conditions.

Biomechanics

In biomechanics, he modeled the behavior of blood and the behavior of soft tissues.

Implicit constitutive theories

Rajagopal introduced implicit constitutive theories to generalize classical fluid models, such as the Euler and Korteweg fluids. These theories aimed to describe phenomena such as capillarity and provided a framework for analyzing complex fluid behaviors.

Pressure-dependent viscosity

He investigated fluids with pressure-dependent viscosities, analyzing the global existence of solutions for flows of such fluids. This research addressed the mathematical challenges associated with modeling fluids whose viscosity changes with pressure.

Rheologically nonstationary fluids

Rajagopal's work also included the development of differential models for rheologically nonstationary fluids, focusing on materials whose rheological properties change over time or under different conditions.

== Awards and honors ==
Rajagopal received several awards, including the Eringen Medal from the Society of Engineering Science (2004), the Werner Medal from the American Society of Mechanical Engineers (2022), and the Genesis Award from Texas A&M University (2024). He was a fellow of the American Society of Mechanical Engineers and the Indian National Academy of Engineering.

He was conferred honorary degrees from several universities, including the University of Pretoria, Charles University, the University of Perugia, and the Gheorghe Asachi Technical University in Iași, Romania. He was frequently listed among the world's most cited researchers and served on editorial boards of over 30 scientific journals.

== Personal life and death ==
He married Chandrika Iyengar, a Jawaharlal Nehru Gold Medalist at Delhi University, in 1974. Rajagopal died on March 20, 2025, in Philadelphia, Pennsylvania.
