= HMS Cheltenham =

Minesweeper of the Royal Navy (1916 - 1927)

History

United Kingdom
- Name: HMS Cheltenham
- Namesake: Cheltenham, Gloucestershire
- Builder: Ardrossan Dockyard
- Launched: 12 April 1916
- Fate: Sold for break up at John Cashmore Ltd, Newport 7 October 1927

General characteristics
- Class & type: Racecourse-class minesweeper
- Displacement: 810 tons
- Length: 235 ft (72 m)
- Beam: 29 ft (8.8 m) (58 ft (18 m) at the paddles)
- Draught: 6.75 ft (2.06 m)
- Propulsion: Designed 1,400 hp (1,000 kW). Inclined compound. Cylindrical return tube.
- Speed: max 15 knots (28 km/h)
- Range: 156 tons coal
- Complement: 50 men
- Armament: 2 × 12-pounder

HMS Cheltenham was a Racecourse-class minesweeper of the Royal Navy built in 1916. The Racecourse class (also called the Ascot class) comprised 32 paddlewheel coastal minesweeping sloops. The ship was named after Cheltenham Racecourse.

After decommissioning she was sold to John Cashmore Ltd for breaking up and arrived at their Newport Yard in 1927.
