= RMS Alaunia (1913) =

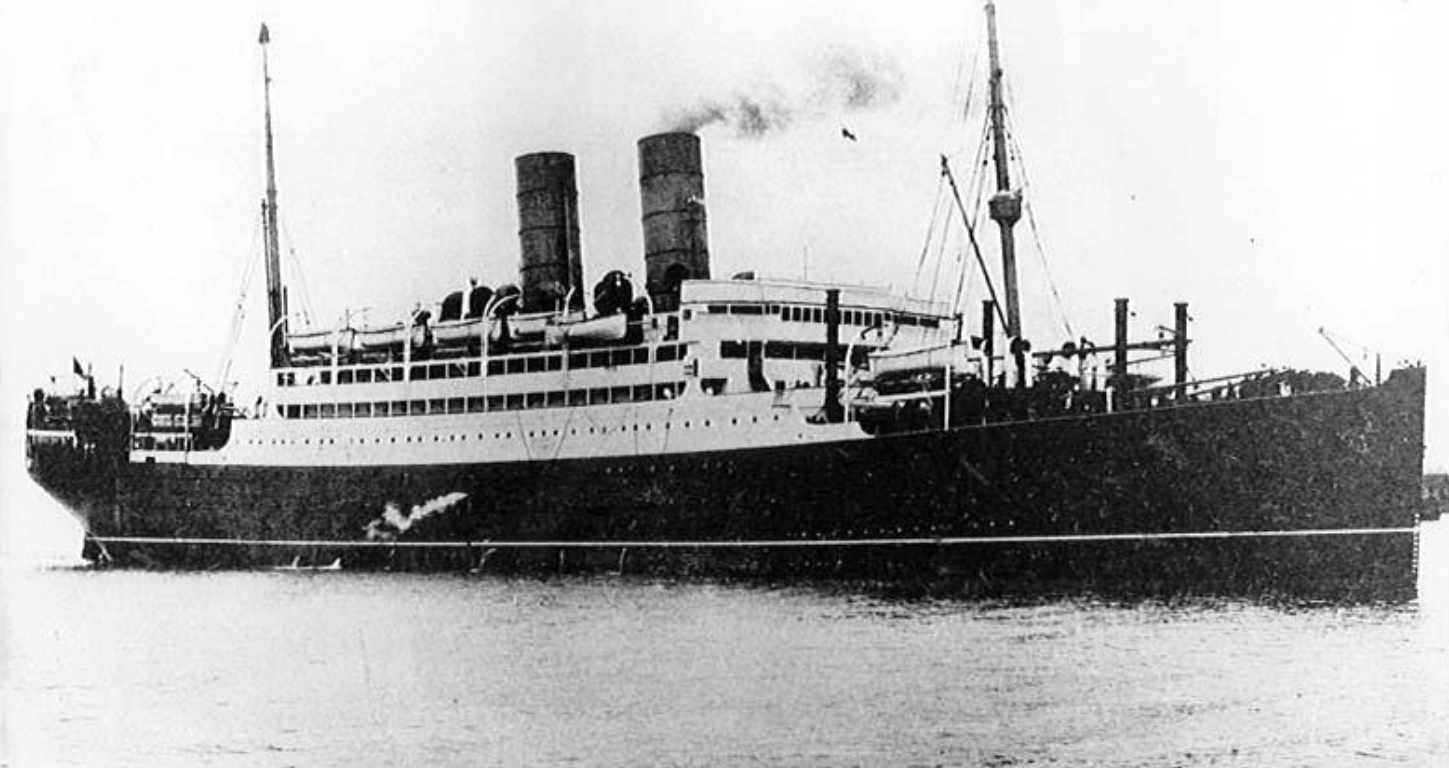
- RMS Alaunia

History

United Kingdom
- Name: Alaunia
- Owner: Cunard Line
- Operator: 1914: (United Kingdom) Royal Navy
- Port of registry: 1913: (United Kingdom) Liverpool
- Builder: Scotts S&E, Greenock
- Yard number: 447
- Launched: 9 June 1913
- Maiden voyage: 27 December 1913
- Identification: UK official number 135513; code letters JDKM; wireless call sign GAI
- Fate: Mined on 19 October 1916 off Eastbourne, East Sussex

General characteristics
- Type: Ocean liner
- Tonnage: 13,405 GRT, 8,261 NRT
- Length: 520.3 ft (158.6 m)
- Beam: 64.0 ft (19.5 m)
- Depth: 43.1 ft (13.1 m)
- Decks: 2
- Installed power: 1,324 NHP
- Propulsion: 2 × quadruple-expansion engines; 2 × screws
- Speed: 15 knots (28 km/h)
- Capacity: 520 Cabin, 1,540 3rd class

RMS Alaunia was a Cunard ocean liner. She was built in 1913 at Greenock and measured 13,405 GRT. She was one of three sister ships Cunard ordered from Scotts Shipbuilding and Engineering Company. Her sisters were RMS Andania, and RMS Aurania. Alaunia was the second of the trio. She and her sisters had only 2nd class and 3rd class accommodation.

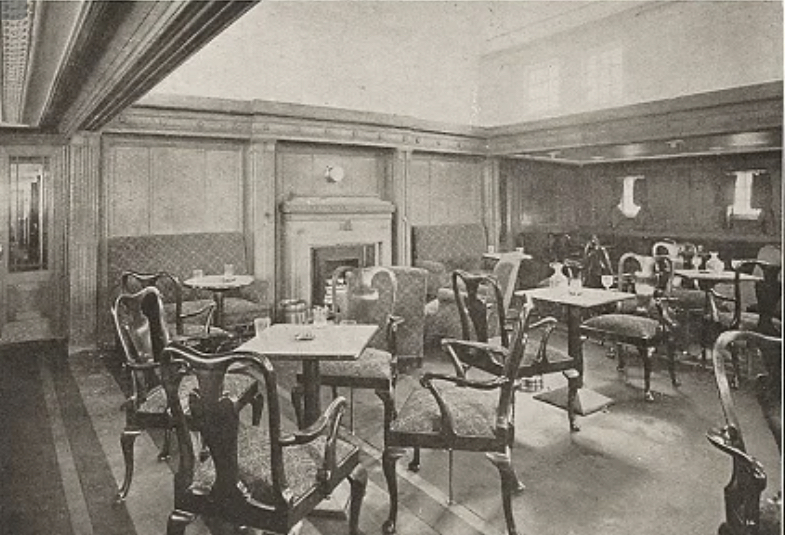
The smoking room onboard RMS Alaunia (1)

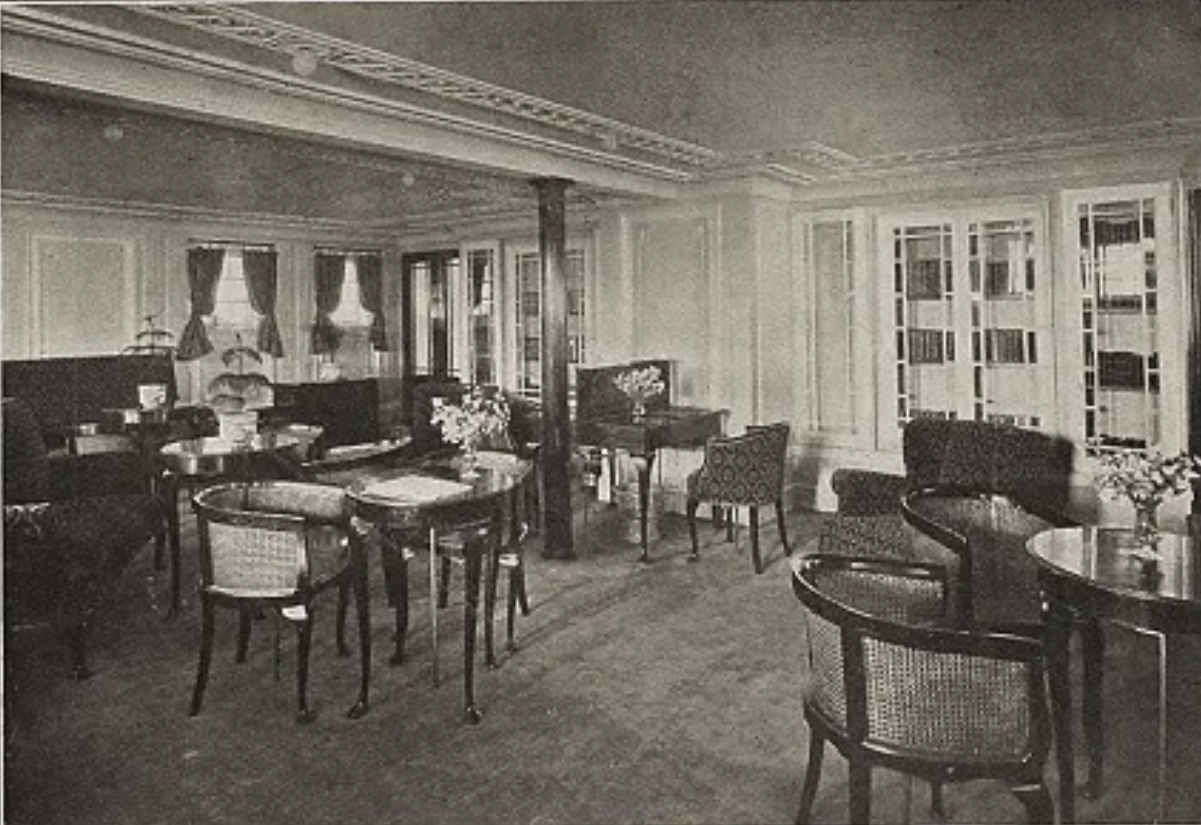
The writing room onboard RMS Alaunia (1)

Alaunia was launched on 9 June 1913, and began her maiden voyage on 27 December 1913. When World War I began in 1914, she was requisitioned as a troopship. HMS Alaunia was the first Cunard ship to carry Canadian troops. Then she worked on carrying troops of the Home Counties Division to Bombay in October. She was sent to the Gallipoli campaign by the summer of 1915. She returned to the North Atlantic and carried troops from Canada and the USA in 1916. During a voyage from London to New York, she struck a mine on 19 October 1916 in the English Channel off the Royal Sovereign Lightship off Eastbourne, East Sussex. laid earlier that day by SM UC-16. After attempts to beach the ship and tow her to shore with tugs, her captain realized the ship was lost and finally gave the order to abandon ship. Two crew members were killed in her sinking. Alaunia's wreck lies on its port side in the English Channel at a depth of 36 metres (118 ft).

Cunard revived the name in 1925 when it had a second RMS Alaunia built. She served until 1957.
