= RMS Andania (1913) =

1913 Passenger-cargo ship

Coordinates: 55°20′N 6°12′W

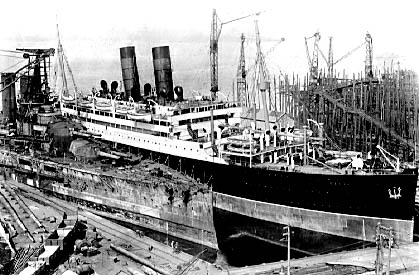
- RMS Andania in Scott's Yard alongside HMS Ajax

History

United Kingdom
- Name: Andania
- Owner: Cunard Line
- Operator: 1914: (United Kingdom) Royal Navy
- Port of registry: 1913: (United Kingdom) Liverpool
- Builder: Scotts S&E, Greenock
- Yard number: 446
- Launched: 22 March 1913
- Completed: 13 July 1913
- Maiden voyage: 14 July 1913
- Identification: UK official number 135481; code letters JCPL; wireless call sign GAH
- Fate: Sunk by torpedo, 27 January 1918

General characteristics
- Type: ocean liner
- Tonnage: 13,405 GRT, 8,275 NRT
- Length: 520.3 ft (158.6 m)
- Beam: 64.0 ft (19.5 m)
- Depth: 43.1 ft (13.1 m)
- Decks: 2
- Installed power: 1,324 NHP
- Propulsion: 2 × quadruple-expansion engines; 2 × screws
- Speed: 15 knots (28 km/h)
- Capacity: passengers: 520 2nd class; 1,540 3rd class

RMS Andania was a Cunard ocean liner built by Scotts Shipbuilding and Engineering Company of Greenock. She was launched on 22 March 1913 and was completed on 13 July 1913.

In World War I Andania transported the Royal Inniskilling Fusiliers and Royal Dublin Fusiliers to Cape Helles for the landing at Suvla Bay by the British IX Corps. The landing was part of the August Offensive during the Battle of Gallipoli.

== Description ==
Andania's registered length was 520.3 ft (158.6 m), her beam was 64.0 ft (19.5 m), and her depth was 43.1 ft (13.1 m). Her tonnages were 13,405 GRT and 8,275 NRT. She had twin funnels and two masts. Her hull was steel and she had twin screws, driven by two quadruple-expansion engines. Their combined power was rated at 1,324 NHP, and gave her a speed of 15 knots (28 km/h). The ship could accommodate 520 second-class and 1,540 third-class passengers. Her sister ships were Alaunia and Aurania which were almost identical and "cater(ed) only for second and third class passengers. The old-style third class dormitories were replaced by four or six-berth cabins."

== History ==
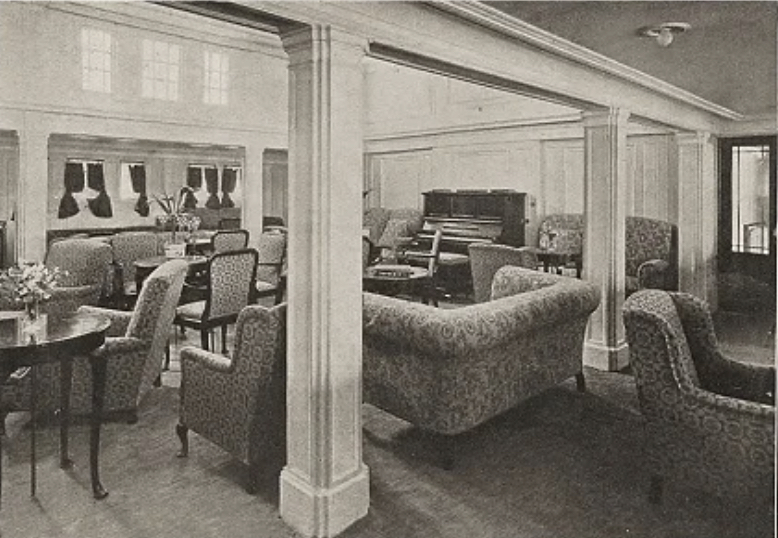
The lounge room on RMS Andania (1)

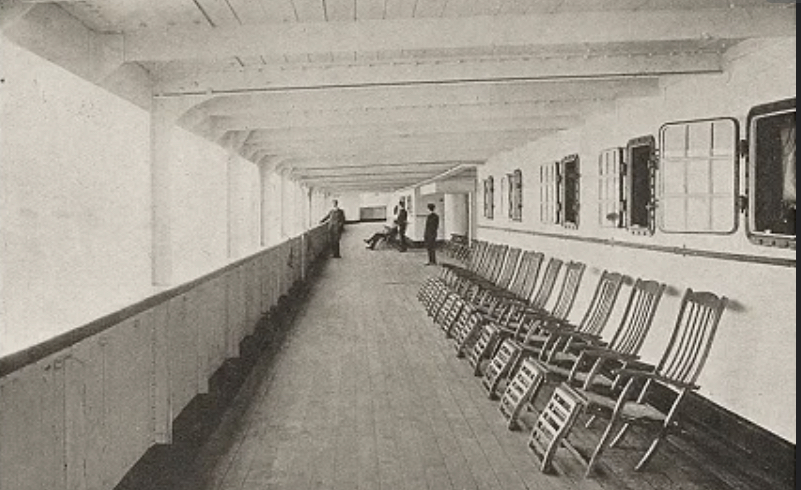
The promenade deck on RMS Andania (1)

The Andania made her maiden voyage on 14 July 1913 from Liverpool via Southampton to Quebec and Montreal.

In August 1914 she was requisitioned as a troopship and made several trips carrying Canadian troops, from 26 September to 27 October 1914. The Andania was used to accommodate German POWs in the Thames from 28 October 1914 to 23 February 1915.

From 24 February 1915 onwards the ship was used in the Gallipoli campaign when she was used to transport the Royal Inniskilling Fusiliers and Royal Dublin Fusiliers to Cape Helles for the landings at Suvla. In late December 1915 she took the 13th and 14th York and Lancaster Regiment (Barnsley Pals) from Plymouth to Port Said in Egypt, to defend the Suez Canal. Her duties supporting the Mediterranean Expeditionary Force ended on 2 March 1916.

After transporting more Canadian troops in 1916, she returned to passenger service in 1917 on the Liverpool – New York route. Andania left Liverpool on 26 January 1918 with 40 passengers and a crew of about 200. she was part of a convoy of seven ships. On 27 January she was hit amidships by a torpedo from German submarine U-46 captained by Leo Hillebrand, two miles north-northeast of Rathlin East (Altacarry Head) lighthouse on Rathlin Island, County Antrim. She immediately listed to starboard and began to sink. Attempts were made to tow the ship but she sank after a few hours. The passengers were saved, but seven crew members were killed. The wreck lies at a depth of between 175 to 189 metres (574 to 620 ft).
