= Sanjeev Shroff =

American bioengineer

Sanjeev Shroff is an American bioengineer currently the Distinguished Professor of and Gerald E. McGinnis Chair in Bioengineering at University of Pittsburgh and an Elected Fellow of the American Physiological Society, American Institute for Medical and Biological Engineering and Biomedical Engineering Society.
