= HMS Eglinton (1916) =

Minesweeper of the Royal Navy

History

United Kingdom
- Name: HMS Eglinton
- Namesake: Eglinton, Ayrshire
- Builder: Ayrshire Dockyard Co
- Launched: 9 September 1916
- Fate: Sold to King Garston, Liverpool July 1922

General characteristics
- Class & type: Racecourse-class minesweeper
- Displacement: 810 tons
- Length: 235 ft (72 m)
- Beam: 29 ft (8.8 m) (58 ft (18 m) at the paddles)
- Draught: 6.75 ft (2.06 m)
- Propulsion: Designed 1,400 hp (1,000 kW). Inclined compound. Cylindrical return tube.
- Speed: max 15 knots (28 km/h)
- Range: 156 tons coal
- Complement: 50 men
- Armament: 2 × 12-pounder

HMS Eglinton was a Racecourse-class minesweeper of the Royal Navy built in 1916. The Racecourse Class (also called the Ascot Class) comprised 32 paddlewheel coastal minesweeping sloops. The vessel was named after the Eglinton Racecourse in Ayrshire, Scotland
