= Pop City =

American online magazine

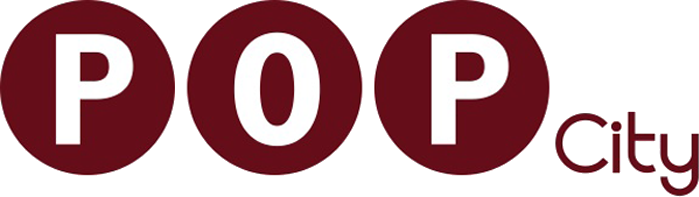
- Former editors: Eve Picker
- Frequency: Weekly (Wednesday)
- Circulation: 39,000 (2014)
- Publisher: Issue Media Group LLC
- Founder: Brian Boyle
- First issue: March 2006
- Final issue: August 2015
- Website: popcitymedia.com

Pop City was a weekly online magazine whose content focused on news and features about Pittsburgh, Pennsylvania. The content focused on talent, innovation, diversity, and environment. The magazine was published between 2006 and 2015.

== History ==
Pop City was launched in March 2006 on a budget of $200,000. The costs were defrayed by pledges from the Urban Redevelopment Authority, The Pittsburgh Cultural Trust, and the Allegheny Conference on Community Development.

The publication held 39,000 subscribers and a team of two dozen stringers. Though Eve Picker was the first publisher, Tracy Certo ran the publication for eight years. She would later found the spiritual successor NEXTPittsburgh.
