= Racecourse-class minesweeper =

Class of British minesweepers

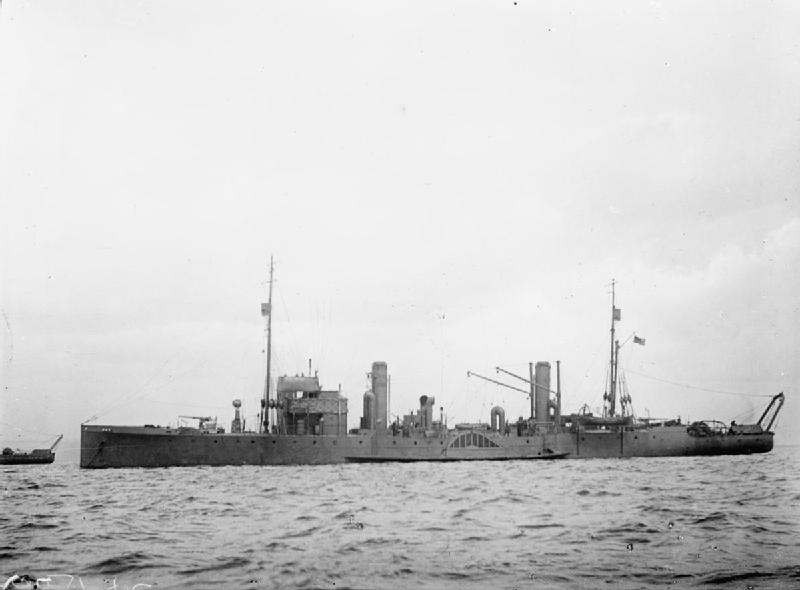
- HMS Plumpton

Class overview
- Name: Racecourse class
- Operators: Royal Navy
- Succeeded by: Halcyon class
- Built: 1916 & 1918
- Completed: 24 Racecourse class; 8 Improved Racecourse class

General characteristics
- Displacement: Racecourse class: 810 long tons (823 t); Improved class: 820 long tons (833 t)
- Length: 235 ft (72 m)
- Beam: Racecourse class: 29 ft (8.8 m); Improved class: 29 ft 3 in (8.92 m); 58 ft (18 m) at the paddles (both types)
- Draught: 6.75–7 ft (2.06–2.13 m)
- Propulsion: Inclined compound. Cylindrical return tube. 1,400 hp (1,000 kW).
- Speed: 15 knots (17 mph; 28 km/h)
- Range: 156 tons coal
- Complement: 50-52 men
- Armament: Racecourse class: 2 × 12-pounder guns; Improved class: 1 × 12-pounder gun; 1 × 3-inch AA gun

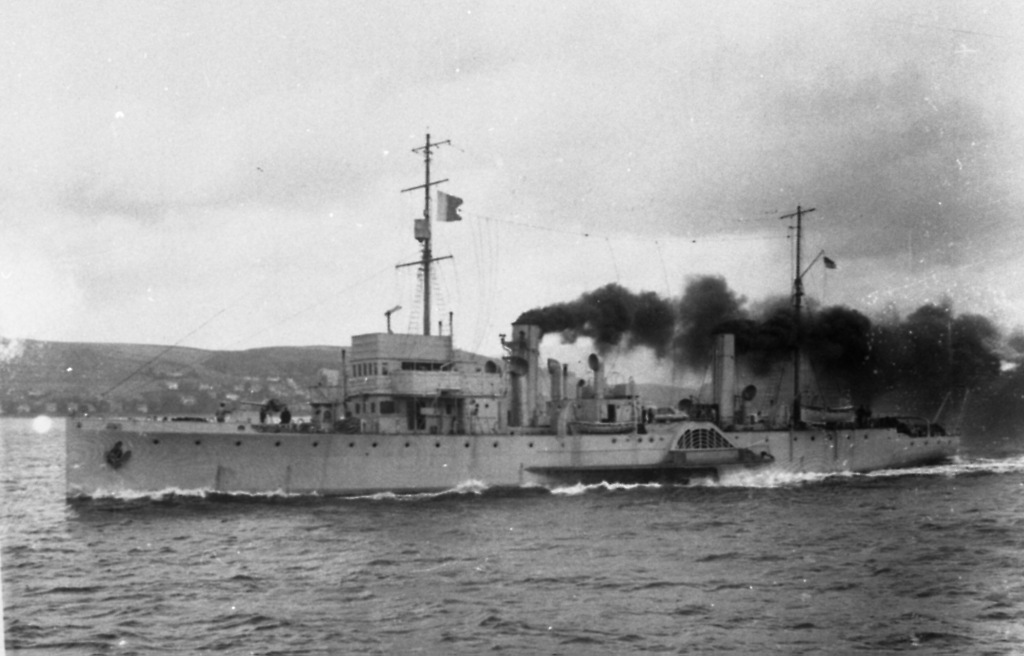
HMS Ascot

The Racecourse-class minesweepers were 32 ships delivered to the Royal Navy during the First World War. They were built to two related designs as paddlewheel coastal minesweeping sloops under the Emergency War Programme. The vessels were reasonable sea-boats, but lost speed badly in a seaway when the paddle boxes tended to become choked with water. The class is also widely referred to as the Ascot class and Improved Ascot class.

== Initial design ==
At the start of the First World War, it soon became clear that a large number of minesweepers would be required to keep coastal shipping routes free from naval mines that were laid at night by fast German minelayers. Initially, requisitioned trawlers were used for the task, but they had too deep a draught to operate in some areas, and could be too slow to sever the mooring cables of the mines. Late in 1914, the Admiralty hired a number of paddle steamers which were built to carry tourists to seaside resorts or on pleasure cruises. They were significantly faster than the trawlers and had a shallower draught. Although unable to operate in rough seas, they were judged to be the best solution to the problem and a requirement was issued for a purpose-built class based on the PS Glen Usk, a Bristol pleasure steamer. Because of their size and simplicity, they could be built in small shipyards without affecting the production of larger warships.

The original design was by the Ailsa Shipbuilding Company. The ships were completed between April and October 1916. Launch dates are shown below.

- HMS Ascot: January 1916, Ailsa S.B. Co—first of class, also last ship to be lost in World War I.
- HMS Atherstone: January 1916, Ailsa S.B. Co. Converted for passenger use in 1929 as PS Queen of Kent. Converted back to minesweeper in 1939.
- HMS Chelmsford: April 1916, Ailsa S.B. Co
- HMS Cheltenham: June 1916, Ardrossan Co
- HMS Chepstow: April 1916, Ayrshire D.Y. Co
- HMS Croxton: April 1916, Ayrshire D.Y. Co
- HMS Doncaster: June 1916 Ayrshire D.Y. Co
- HMS Eglinton: September 1916, Ayrshire D.Y. Co
- HMS Epsom: May 1916, G. Brown
- HMS Eridge: February 1916, Clyde S.B. Co. Originally fitted to carry seaplanes.
- HMS Gatwick: April 1916, Dundee S.B. Co.
- HMS Goodwood: June 1916, Dundee S.B. Co.
- HMS Haldon: March 1916, Dunlop, Bremner
- HMS Hurst: May 1916, Dunlop, Bremner
- HMS Kempton: Ferguson Bros. Lost in World War I.
- HMS Lingfield: April 1916, Fleming & Ferguson
- HMS Ludlow: Goole Co.—lost in World War I.
- HMS Melton: March 1916, Hamilton. Originally fitted to carry seaplanes. Converted for passenger use in 1929 as PS Queen of Thanet. Converted back to minesweeper in 1940; served at Dunkirk evacuation and Normandy landings.
- HMS Newbury: July 1916, A. & J. Inglis
- HMS Plumpton: McMillan—lost in World War I.
- HMS Pontefract: June 1916, Murdoch & Murray
- HMS Redcar: Ayrshire D.Y. Co.—lost in World War I.
- HMS Sandown: July 1916, Dunlop, Bremner
- HMS Totnes: May 1916, McMillan

On this type the foremast is stepped before the fore bridges and have derricks abeam of the second funnel.

== Improved Racecourse type ==
These paddle minesweepers were designed by the Admiralty, adapted from the Ailsa Company design for the first type. They were completed between January and June 1918. All were built under the Emergency War Programme.

- HMS Banbury: December 1917, Ailsa S.B. Co.
- HMS Harpenden: February 1918, Ailsa S.B. Co.
- HMS Hexham: December 1917, Clyde S.B. Co.
- HMS Lanark: December 1917, Fleming & Ferguson
- HMS Lewes: March 1918, Fleming & Ferguson
- HMS Shincliffe: January 1918, Dunlop, Bremner
- HMS Shirley: Dunlop, Bremner. Sold as a ferry boat, 1919.
- HMS Wetherby: March 1918, Murdoch & Murray.

The foremast on this type is stepped through the chart house, there are two high ventilators abaft fore funnel and no derricks abeam of the second funnel.
