= 2-pounder gun =

2-pounder gun, 2-pounder and QF 2 pounder or QF 2-pdr are abbreviations used for various guns which fired a projectile weighing approximately 2 pounds (0.91 kg). These include:

- QF 2 pounder Mk II & Mk VIII "pom-pom" Vickers 40mm naval anti-aircraft autocannon of the First World War and the Second World War
- Rolls-Royce 40 mm cannon, known as "QF 2 pounder Mk XIV" Rolls-Royce 40mm gun of the Second World War
- Ordnance QF 2-pounder Mk IX and Mk X British 40mm tank and anti-tank gun of the Second World War
