= List of ship names of the Royal Navy (G–H) =

This is a list of Royal Navy ship names starting with G and H.

== G ==
- G1
- G2
- G3
- G4
- G5
- G6
- G7
- G8
- G9
- G10
- G11
- G12
- G13
- G14
- G15
- Gabbard
- Gabriel
- Gabriel Harfleur
- Gabriel Royal
- Gaddesden
- Gadfly
- Gadwell
- Gael
- Gaiete
- Gaillarda
- Gaillardia
- Gainsborough
- Gala
- Galatea
- Galathee
- Galgo
- Galicia
- Gallant
- Gallarita
- Gallion
- Galliot
- Galteemore
- Gambia
- Gamston
- Ganges
- Ganges II
- Gannet
- Ganymede
- Gardenia
- Gardiner
- Garland
- Garlies
- Garnet
- Garry
- Garth
- Gaspee
- Gatwick
- Gaul
- Gauntlet
- Gavinton
- Gavotte
- Gawler
- Gay Archer
- Gay Bombardier
- Gay Bowman
- Gay Bruiser
- Gay Carabineer
- Gay Cavalier
- Gay Centurion
- Gay Dragoon
- Gay Fencer
- Gay Forester
- Gayundah
- Gazelle
- Gelykneid
- General Abercrombie
- General Brackenbury
- General Craufurd
- General Elles
- General Elliot
- General Grant
- General Monk
- General Platt
- General Wolfe
- Genereux
- Genista
- Genoa
- Gentian
- Gentille
- George
- George III
- Georgeham
- Georgetown
- Georgiana
- Geraldton
- Geranium
- Germaine
- Germoon Prize
- Gerrans Bay
- Geyser
- Ghurka
- Giang Bee
- Gibraltar
- Gibraltar Prize
- Gier
- Gifford
- Gift
- Gift Minor
- Giles
- Gilia
- Gilliflower
- Gipsy
- Girdle Ness
- Girl Helen
- Girl Mary
- Gironde
- Gladiator
- Gladiolus
- Glaisdale
- Glamorgan
- Glasgow
- Glasserton
- Glassford
- Glatton
- Gleaner
- Glenarm
- Glenearn
- Glengyle
- Glenmore
- Glenroy
- Glentham
- Gloaming
- Globe
- Gloire
- Glommen
- Glorieux
- Gloriosa
- Glorioso
- Glorious
- Glory
- Glory IV
- Gloucester
- Gloucestershire
- Glowworm
- Gloxinia
- Gluckstadt
- Gnat
- Go Ahead
- Goathland
- Godetia
- Goelan
- Gold Coast
- Golden Falcon
- Golden Fleece
- Golden Horse
- Golden Lion
- Golden Rose
- Goldfinch
- Goliath
- Good Design
- Good Fortune
- Good Hope
- Good Intent
- Good Will
- Goodall
- Goodgrace
- Goodson
- Goodwin
- Goodwood
- Goole
- Gordon
- Gore
- Goree
- Gorey Castle
- Gorgon
- Gorleston
- Goshawk
- Gosport
- Gossamer
- Goulburn
- Gould
- Gown Hill
- Gozo
- Grace Dieu
- Grace of God
- Grace
- Gracie Fields
- Grafton
- Gramont
- Grampian
- Grampus
- Grana
- Granado
- Grand Turk
- Grandmistress
- Grangermouth
- Granicus
- Grantham
- Graph
- Grappler
- Grasshopper
- Gravelines
- Grayfly
- Grays
- Great Barbara
- Great Bark
- Great Elizabeth
- Great Galley
- Great Harry
- Great Nicholas
- Great Pinnace
- Great Zabra
- Greatford
- Grecian
- Green Linnet
- Greenfish
- Greenfly
- Greenock
- Greenwich
- Greetham
- Grenada
- Grenade
- Grenado
- Grenville
- Gretna
- Grey Fox
- Grey Wolf
- Greyfly
- Greyhond
- Greyhound
- Griffin
- Griffon
- Grimsby
- Grindall
- Grinder
- Griper
- Grive
- Grouper
- Grove
- Growler
- Guachapin
- Guadeloupe
- Guardian
- Guardland
- Guardsman
- Guelderland
- Guepe
- Guernsey
- Guerriere
- Guilder De Ruyter
- Guildford Castle
- Guildford
- Guillemot
- Guinea
- Guinevere
- Gulland
- Gulnare
- Gurkha
- Guysborough

== H ==
- (H)1
- (H)2
- (H)3
- (H)4
- (H)5
- (H)6
- H1
- H2
- H3
- H4
- H5
- H6
- H7
- H8
- H9
- H10
- H11
- H12
- H13
- H14
- H15
- H16
- H17
- H18
- H19
- H20
- H21
- H22
- H23
- H24
- H25
- H26
- H27
- H28
- H29
- H30
- H31
- H32
- H33
- H34
- H35
- H36
- H37
- H38
- H39
- H40
- H41
- H42
- H43
- H44
- H45
- H46
- H47
- H48
- H49
- H50
- H51
- H52
- H53
- Haddock
- Hadleigh Castle
- Haerlem
- Halberd
- Halcyon
- Haldon
- Half Moon
- Halifax
- Halladale
- Halsham
- Halstarr
- Halstead
- Hamadryad
- Hambledon
- Hampshire
- Hampton Court
- Handmaid
- Handy
- Hannam
- Hannibal
- Happy
- Happy Entrance
- Happy Ladd
- Happy Return
- Hardi
- Hardinge
- Hardy
- Hare
- Harebell
- Harfruen
- Hargood
- Harland
- Harlech
- Harlequin
- Harman
- Harold
- Harp
- Harpenden
- Harpham
- Harpy
- Harrier
- Harriot
- Harrow
- Hart
- Hartland
- Hartland Point
- Hartlepool
- Harvester
- Harwich
- Hastings
- Hasty
- Hatherleigh
- Haughty
- Havannah
- Havant
- Havelock
- Haversham
- Havick
- Havock
- Hawk
- Hawke
- Hawkins
- Hawthorn
- Haydon
- Hayling
- Hazard Prize
- Hazard
- Hazardous
- Hazel
- Hazleton
- Heart of Oak
- Heartsease
- Hearty
- Heather
- Hebe
- Hecate
- Hecla
- Hector
- Hedingham Castle
- Heir Apparent
- Helder
- Helderenberg
- Heldin
- Helena
- Helford
- Helicon
- Heliotrope
- Helmsdale
- Helmsley Castle
- Helverson
- Hemlock
- Henrietta
- Henrietta Maria
- Henry
- Henry Galley
- Henry Grace à Dieu
- Henry of Hampton
- Henry Prize
- Hepatica
- Herald
- Hercules
- Hereward
- Hermes
- Hermione
- Herne Bay
- Hero
- Heroine
- Heron
- Hesper
- Hesperus
- Hestor
- Heureux
- Hever Castle
- Hexham
- Hexton
- Heythrop
- Hibernia
- Hibiscus
- Hickleton
- Highburton
- Highflyer
- Highlander
- Highway
- Hilary
- Hildersham
- Himalaya
- Hinchinbrook
- Hind
- Hindostan
- Hindustan
- Hinksford
- Hippomenes
- Hirondelle
- Hobart
- Hodgeston
- Hogue
- Holcombe
- Holderness
- Holdernesse
- Holighost
- Holigost Spayne
- Holigost
- Holland
- Holland 1
- Holland 2
- Holland 3
- Holland 4
- Holland 5
- Hollesley Bay
- Holly
- Hollyhock
- Holm Sound
- Holmes
- Holstein
- Honesty
- Honeysuckle
- Hong Kong
- Hong Lam
- Hood
- Hope
- Hope Prize
- Hopewell
- Hoptown
- Horatio
- Hornby
- Hornet
- Hornpipe
- Horseman
- Horsleydown
- Hoste
- Hostile
- Hotham
- Hotspur
- Houghton
- Hound
- House de Swyte
- Hoverfly
- Hovingham
- Howe
- Howett
- Howitzer
- Hubberston
- Hugh Lindsay
- Hugh Rose
- Hughes
- Hulvul
- Humber
- Hunter
- Huntley
- Huron
- Hurricane
- Hursley
- Hurst
- Hurst Castle
- Hurworth
- Hussar
- Hyacinth
- Hyaena
- Hyderabad
- Hydra
- Hydrangea
- Hygeia
- Hyperion
- Hythe

== See also ==
- List of aircraft carriers of the Royal Navy
- List of amphibious warfare ships of the Royal Navy
- List of pre-dreadnought battleships of the Royal Navy
- List of dreadnought battleships of the Royal Navy
- List of battlecruisers of the Royal Navy
- List of cruiser classes of the Royal Navy
- List of destroyer classes of the Royal Navy
- List of patrol vessels of the Royal Navy
- List of frigate classes of the Royal Navy
- List of monitors of the Royal Navy
- List of mine countermeasure vessels of the Royal Navy (includes minesweepers and mine hunters)
- List of Royal Fleet Auxiliary ship names
- List of submarines of the Royal Navy
- List of survey vessels of the Royal Navy
- List of Royal Navy shore establishments
