= HMS Holland =

HMS Holland may refer to the following ships of the Royal Navy:

- HMS Holland 1
- HMS Holland 2
- HMS Holland 3
- HMS Holland 4
- HMS Holland 5
- HMS Holland 6

== See also ==
- Holland (disambiguation)
