= HMS Holland 5 =

Submarine of the Royal Navy

Coordinates: 50.729°N 0.248°E

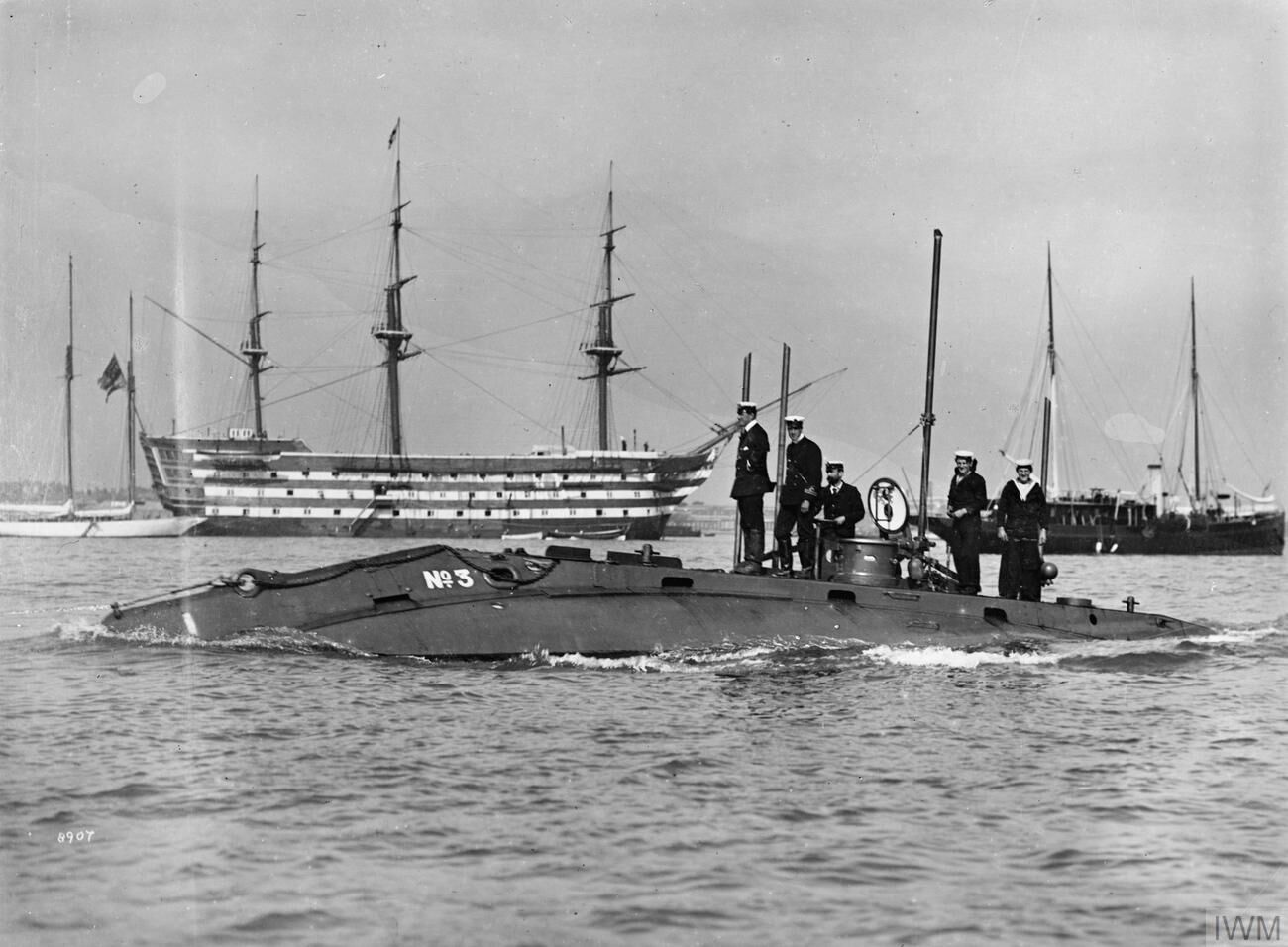
- A submarine of the Holland class

History

United Kingdom
- Name: Holland 5
- Ordered: 1900
- Builder: Vickers, Sons and Maxim, Barrow
- Launched: 10 June 1902
- Commissioned: 1902
- Fate: Foundered off Beachy Head, 8 August 1912

General characteristics
- Type: Submarine
- Displacement: 105 long tons (107 t) (submerged)
- Length: 63 ft 5 in (19.33 m)
- Beam: 11 ft 10 in (3.61 m)
- Draught: 11 ft 10 in (3.61 m)
- Installed power: 160 hp (120 kW) (petrol engine); 70 hp (52 kW) (electric motor)
- Propulsion: 1 × petrol engine; 1 × electric motor; 1 × screw
- Speed: 7 kn (8.1 mph; 13 km/h) submerged
- Range: 20 nmi (23 mi; 37 km) at 7 kn (8.1 mph; 13 km/h) submerged
- Test depth: 100 ft (30 m)
- Complement: 8
- Armament: 1 × 18 inch (450 mm) torpedo tube (Up to 3 torpedoes)

Holland 5 was the last of the five Holland-class submarines ordered by the British Admiralty to evaluate the potential of the submarine with the Royal Navy. She was one of the first submarines to be accepted into Royal Navy service, and unique to her class, she carried one of the earliest periscopes. By the time she was launched, a number of A-class submarines had already been ordered to replace this class in navy service.

She had a single-hull design, built from "s" grade steel. She sank whilst under tow to the scrap yard in 1912, possibly caused by the torpedo hatch being left open. The wreck was rediscovered in 2000 and was designated under the Protection of Wrecks Act in 2005. The wreck is a Protected Wreck managed by Historic England.

Damage has been caused to the site in recent years, and at some point between September 2008 and June 2010, the torpedo hatch was stolen off the wreck.

== Design and description ==
Holland 5 was the fifth of the experimental Holland-class submarines to be launched on 10 June 1902 at a cost of £35,000. She was built by Vickers, Sons and Maxim in Barrow-in-Furness, under licence from Holland Torpedo Boat Company and to a design by John Phillip Holland. She was launched one month ahead of Holland 6 (which was later designated A1). The British Holland class was an extension of the design used on USS Holland.

She was equipped with one of the first periscopes; at the time of her launch, no other submarines in the Royal Navy or the United States Navy were so equipped. It was of British design, which used a ball and socket joint on the hull to raise and lower the scope. She was constructed of "s" grade steel, which at the time of her construction was only used on this class of submarine and the Forth Bridge. She utilised a single-hull design, and so her pressure hull contained her fuel tanks, ballast and other internal workings. However, she was limited to a maximum depth of 100 feet (30 m).

== Service history ==
Along with Holland 3, she was one of the first two submarines to be accepted into Royal Navy service on 19 January 1903. However, by the time she was launched she was already considered obsolete and thirteen A-class submarines had already been ordered.

On 4 March 1903, she was part of the flotilla of Holland-class submarines that were undergoing a demonstration for Captain Reginald Bacon in Stokes Bay when a petrol explosion occurred aboard Holland 1. Along with the other Holland-class submarines, she was quickly reduced to the role of harbor defense and training. By 1909, at the time of fleet display in the Thames, the Holland class were no longer considered "seaworthy" by the media. In 1910, Holland 5 ran aground off Fort Blockhouse, the location of HMS Dolphin and the home of the Royal Navy Submarine Service.

By 1912, the decision was made to scrap the Holland-class vessels. The submarine foundered in the English Channel off Beachy Head, Sussex, on 8 August 1912, when she was under tow on the way to being scrapped at Sheerness. It was not clear why she sank, but a theory is that the torpedo tube hatch was left open, causing the boat to take on water.

== Wreck discovery and research ==
In September 2000, the wreck of submarine Holland 5 was discovered at a depth of 98 ft (30 m) about 6 miles (9.7 km) off the British coast near Eastbourne. In April 2001, the Archaeological Diving Unit conducted a sonar scan and confirmed the identity of the wreck. The boat sits upright on the seabed.

On 4 January 2005, Andrew McIntosh, Minister for Tourism and Heritage of the Department for Culture, Media and Sport, announced that the wreck was designated under the Protection of Wrecks Act. This makes trophy hunting and vandalism of the site a criminal offence.

In 2010, it was discovered that at some point divers had stolen the torpedo tube hatch off the wreck. It was determined that the item would have no monetary value and would have gone into a private collection. There were no official dives on the wreck during 2009 due to the conditions, and the last sighting of the hatch in place was in September 2008. Further damage has been caused to the site by fishing nets, which may have resulted in damage to the periscope and the other implements installed on the upper superstructure.

Holland 5 remains the only submarine of her class on the seabed. Holland 1, the only other boat of her class remaining, is on show at the Royal Navy Submarine Museum in Gosport, Hampshire. Species seen on or around the wreck site include brown crabs, European spider crabs, poutings, poor cod, Sagartia elegans (a species of sea anemone), worms of the Serpulidae family, and European Conger.

== See also ==
- Archaeology of shipwrecks
- List of designations under the Protection of Wrecks Act
- Maritime archaeology
- Underwater archaeology
