= Holland-class =

Holland-class may refer to one of these ship classes:

- A group of the United States S-class submarine (Holland-Type)
- Holland-class cruiser, a class of six protected cruisers of the Royal Netherlands Navy
- Holland-class destroyer, a class of four destroyers of the Royal Netherlands Navy
- Holland-class offshore patrol vessel, a class of offshore patrol vessels for the Royal Netherlands Navy
- Holland-class submarine, a class of five submarines of the Royal Navy

== See also ==
- Holland-class submarine (disambiguation)
- Halland-class destroyer
