= Hedingham =

Hedingham may refer to:

== Places ==
- Castle Hedingham, a village in Essex, United Kingdom
- Hedingham, a neighborhood in Raleigh, North Carolina that was the location of the 2022 Raleigh shootings
- Sible Hedingham, a village in Essex, United Kingdom

== Ships ==
- HMS Hedingham Castle (K491), a Royal Navy ship launched on 26 January 1944, and renamed HMCS Orangeville before launch.
- HMS Hedingham Castle (K529), a Royal Navy ship launched on 30 October 1944 and broken up in 1958.

== Other ==
- Hedingham Castle, a Norman keep in the British village of Castle Hedingham
- Hedingham & Chambers, a bus operating company in the East of England
- Hedingham School, an academy secondary school in Sible Hedingham, Essex
- Hedingham, a street in Moira, County Down, United Kingdom
