= HMS Hedingham Castle =

Two British Royal Navy warships have been named Hedingham Castle, after Hedingham Castle in Essex. They were both Castle-class corvettes built during the Second World War.

- HMS Hedingham Castle (K491) was transferred to the Royal Canadian Navy before launching and renamed HMCS Orangeville. She was launched on 26 January 1944.
- HMS Hedingham Castle (K529) was launched on 30 October 1944 and broken up in 1958.
