= HMS Grenada =

Four ships of the Royal Navy have been named HMS Grenada (or Granada), after the island of Grenada:

- HMS Grenada (1693) (or Granada) was a 12-gun bomb vessel of 279 tons (bm) launched at Rotherhithe on 26 June 1693. She was under the command of Captain Thomas Willshaw and participating in a bombardment of Le Havre on 16 July 1694 when a shell fired from the town exploded on her, "blowing her to pieces".
- HMS Grenada (1804) was the French privateer schooner Harmonie, launched in 1800 and captured in 1803 that the inhabitants of Grenada donated to the Royal Navy in 1804; at the end of 1810 she was sold for breaking up.
- HMS Grenada (1807) was the French 16-gun privateer Iéna, which HMS Cruizer captured in the North Sea in 1807. The Royal Navy took her into service but it is not clear that she was ever commissioned; she was last listed in 1814.

== See also ==
- HMS Granado
  - HMS Granado (1695) (or HMS Grenada) was a 4-gun bomb vessel launched at Deptford in 1695, and broken up in May 1718.
- HMS Grenade (H86)
