= Hamadryad (disambiguation) =

The term hamadryad has several uses:

- Hamadryad, a kind of nymph in Greek mythology
- Hamadryad, another term for the king cobra
- Hamadryas baboon, a species of baboon
- Hamadryad, an alien species in Alastair Reynolds's novel Revelation Space
- Hamadryad, progressive rock band from Canada
- Hamadryad, a character introduced in Robert A. Heinlein's novel Time Enough for Love
- Hamadryad, a natural history journal from India
- Hamadryad, the common name of the butterfly species Tellervo zoilus, endemic to far north Queensland in Australia
- Three British warships named HMS Hamadryad
- Royal Hamadryad Hospital, Cardiff
