= HMS Gallant =

Four ships of the Royal Navy have borne the name HMS Gallant:

- HMS Gallant (1797) was a gunvessel launched in 1797, and known for at least some of her career as Gunboat No. 29. She was sold in 1802.
- HMS Gallant (1804) was a 12-gun gun-brig launched in 1804 and sold in 1815.
- HMS Gallant (H59) was a G-class destroyer launched in 1935. She was damaged by a mine in 1941 and an air raid in 1942, being declared a total loss. She was sunk as a blockship in 1943 and the wreck dispersed in 1953.
- HMS Gallant was to have been a G-class destroyer. She was ordered in 1944 as HMS Gael, but was cancelled the following year.
