= HMS Glowworm =

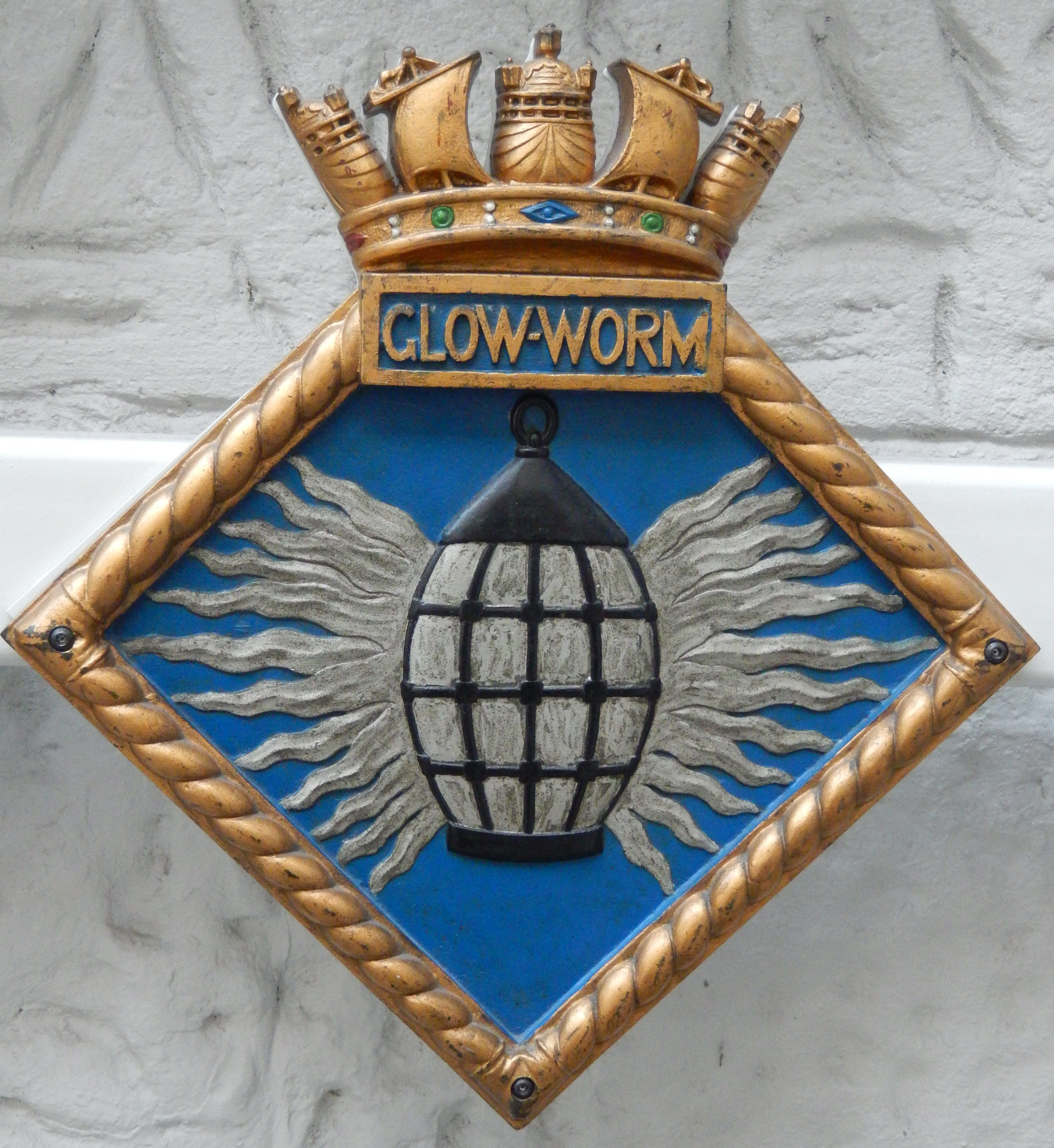
Badge of HMS Glow-worm

Three ships of the Royal Navy have borne the name HMS Glowworm after the insect, whilst two more were planned:

- Glowworm, was briefly the name of a coastal destroyer launched on 12 December 1906 and renamed HMS TB 7. It was sold in May 1921.
- HMS Glowworm (1916), an Insect-class gunboat, launched on 5 February 1916 and sold in 1928.
- HMS Glowworm (H92), a G-class destroyer launched on 22 July 1935, sunk on 8 April 1940 by the German heavy cruiser Admiral Hipper off Norway.
- Glowworm was allocated to a G-class destroyer under construction at the William Denny shipyard at Dumbarton in 1945. The vessel was originally called HMS Guinevere but was renamed in September 1945 to HMS Glowworm, and renamed again in October to HMS Gift. Construction was cancelled on 1 December 1945 before completion.
- Glowworm was allocated in October 1945 to a similar G-class destroyer under construction by John I. Thornycroft & Company Limited, and originally called HMS Gift. Construction was cancelled on 12 December 1945 before completion.

== Battle honours ==
Ships named Glowworm have earned the following battle honours:

- Atlantic, 1939
- Norway, 1940
- Admiral Hipper, 1940
