= Holland-class submarine =

Submarine class

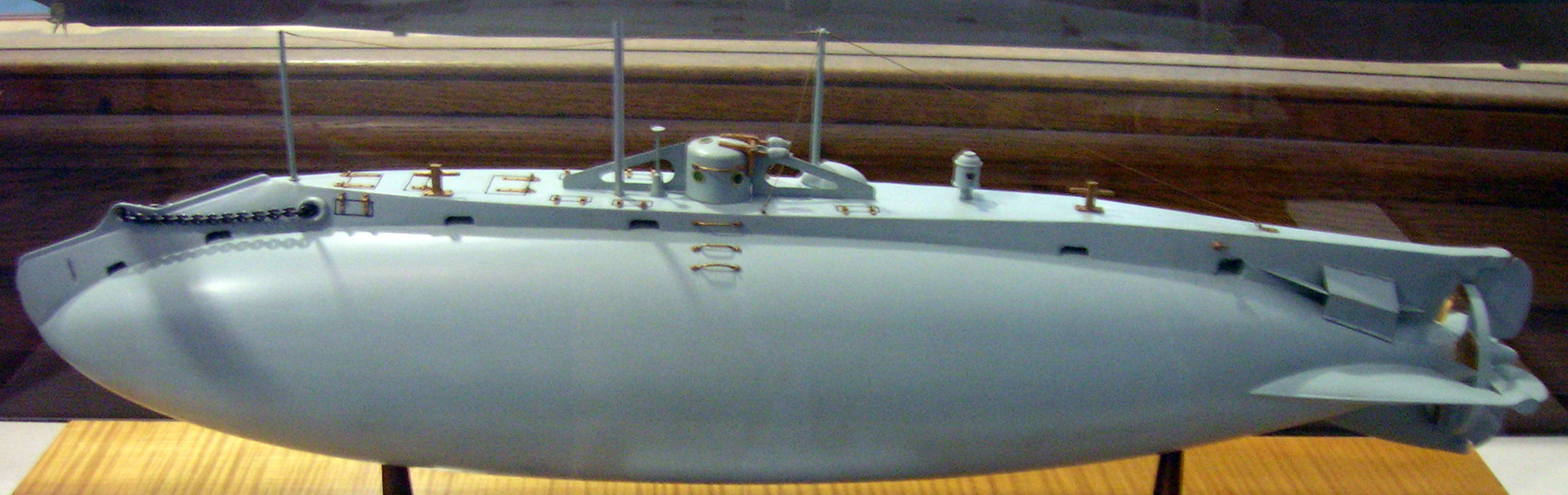
- Model of Holland 1 at the Royal Navy Submarine Museum

Class overview
- Name: Holland class
- Builders: Vickers, Barrow
- Operators: Royal Navy
- Preceded by: none
- Succeeded by: A class
- In commission: 2 February 1903 - 1913
- Completed: 5
- Lost: 2
- Retired: 3
- Preserved: 1

General characteristics
- Type: Midget submarine
- Displacement: 110 long tons (112 t) surfaced; 123 long tons (125 t) submerged
- Length: 63 ft 10 in (19.46 m)
- Beam: 11 ft 9 in (3.58 m)
- Propulsion: Petrol engine, 160 hp (119 kW); Electric motor, 74 hp (55 kW)
- Speed: 8 knots (9.2 mph; 15 km/h) surfaced; 7 knots (8.1 mph; 13 km/h) submerged
- Range: 250 nmi (460 km) at 8 kn (9.2 mph; 15 km/h) surfaced; 20 nmi (37 km) at 7 kn (8.1 mph; 13 km/h) submerged
- Complement: 8
- Armament: 1 × 14 in (360 mm) torpedo tube; 2 torpedoes

The Holland class were the first submarines built for the Royal Navy. They were built by Vickers, Barrow-in-Furness. The first three were designed by John Philip Holland. The Hollands were built under licence from the Holland Torpedo Boat Company/Electric Boat Company during the years 1901 to 1903. The Admiralty hoped to keep the Holland class a secret, and very few senior officers even knew of their existence. This led to the myth of the Admiralty not taking any interest in submarines. On the contrary, the Admiralty was well aware of the submarine's destructive potential. It therefore refrained from any submarine development programme so as to avoid provoking similar programmes on the part of foreign navies. Once those navies did begin serious submarine programmes, the Admiralty had no choice but to begin its own.

== Adoption of the submarine ==
Captain Henry Jackson, British naval attaché in Paris, had been instructed to report on submarine developments which had been underway in France for several years. In 1898 he witnessed trials of the privately developed Le Goubet, a small 11-ton submersible designed to be carried on board a warship. In January 1899 he informed the Admiralty of exercises with the 270-ton experimental submarine Gustave Zédé which had been used to launch a torpedo attack on the battleship Magenta. The Board of Admiralty considered whether it needed to act, but rejected further reports that the French had ordered up to a dozen submarines in the light of other reports on the trial suggesting that its outcome had been stage-managed for political reasons.

In January 1900, the Washington attaché Captain Charles Ottley reported that the US government was considering purchasing a submarine-boat designed by John Holland and provided the Admiralty with US Navy reports on the boat's performance and a set of blueprints. In February the new Paris attaché submitted further favourable reports on the capabilities of Gustave Zédé. Meanwhile, Admiral Fisher commanding the Mediterranean Fleet, which might be required to fight the French, asked the Admiralty for instructions on the best defence against submarines and suggested the use of defensive mines. In May the Admiralty responded by instructing the torpedo school to investigate means of combatting submarines, whereupon they requested a submarine with which to experiment, while in the same month news arrived confirming the US purchase of a Holland boat, USS Holland. First Sea Lord Walter Kerr and the Controller, Rear Admiral Arthur K. Wilson, were convinced of the need to obtain a submarine for the Royal Navy to investigate its capabilities and means to combat submarine attack.

No British shipbuilder had experience of constructing submarines, so the Admiralty began negotiations with the Holland Torpedo Boat Company and Vickers Ltd, which was a major shipbuilder for the Admiralty. It was agreed that The Electric Boat Company (having purchased the rights from Holland) would license Vickers to build submarines in Britain, and an order was placed for five. The Board of Admiralty now considered that the submarines might also be useful in an offensive role, not merely to practice defence, and if trials of the boats were successful further orders would be placed with Vickers.

A general election in November 1900 led to a change of First Lord of the Admiralty from George Goschen to the Earl of Selborne. The new Parliamentary Secretary to the board was Hugh Oakley Arnold-Forster, who as a backbench Member of Parliament had criticised Goschen for failing to adopt submarines. Now he discovered that the Admiralty had been doing so in secret. Selborne became concerned that even so the Admiralty was lagging some way behind the French in development, and the first boat, whose contract was finally signed December 1900, would not be delivered until October 1901. Arnold-Forster proposed involving other companies in constructing submarines, but this was opposed by the Second Sea Lord, Vice Admiral Archibald Douglass, as well as by Wilson, on the grounds that it remained unwise to encourage the general development of the submarine, which might be of more benefit to smaller navies rather than the RN. Wilson considered that the limited range of existing submarines meant they would only be able to operate in French waters, whereas if further developed could become a weapon to threaten British home ports. He recognised the potential of the submarine to prevent maritime trade, which was essential to the survival of an island nation like Britain. Any steps possible to slow down submarine development should be taken while the navy worked on means of defence against the submarine.

In the event, the story that Vickers was building submarines was leaked by a Glasgow newspaper in February, and confirmed by the Admiralty in March. Arnold-Forster continued to press for more submarines to be built, considering that the navy either needed a great many or none, but although Selborne was inclined to agree, the two were opposed by the Sea Lords. It was agreed that only three per year would be ordered, which was the minimum number needed for Vickers to continue their specialist construction team. It was known that the French design was technically superior to the Holland boats ordered, but the Admiralty had no better design available at that time.

== Further development ==
Construction of the boats took longer than anticipated, with the first only ready for a diving trial at sea on 6 April 1902. Although the design had been purchased entire from the US company, the actual design used, Fulton, was an untested improved version of the original Holland design using a new 180 hp petrol engine.

The Admiralty decided to appoint an Inspecting Captain of Submarines to oversee development work, and Captain Reginald Bacon was appointed in May 1901. Bacon was a technically minded officer experienced with the use of surface torpedo boats. His first recommendations were to note that the Holland submarines were likely to compare poorly to the current French design and would be unable to operate on the surface in anything other than fair weather (the boats had a range of only 20 miles (32 km) underwater). He therefore suggested the designs of boats four and five, which had not yet been started, should be modified to improve their seaworthiness. The Admiralty felt the Holland company would refuse any responsibility for difficulties arising from unauthorised design changes, but agreed to order one submarine of a new design, the A1.

Experiments were conducted in 1901 at the torpedo school attempting to blow up a torpedo with underwater charges. In November 1902 Holland 1 finally became available for testing and was used as target with live explosive charges. It was found that the boat came to no harm from a 200 lb (91 kg) guncotton charge exploded at a distance of 80 yards (73 m). Since there was no known way of locating a submarine even to this accuracy, it was concluded that it was effectively impossible to attack submerged submarines. Destroyers were more at risk themselves from their own experimental charges thrown off the stern but in any case were not big enough to carry more than two charges. However, Bacon was much more optimistic over the offensive capabilities of the submarine, concluding that a group of 3–5 would be an insurmountable obstacle for any enemy ships attempting to operate near a port where the submarines were based.

== Service ==
The submarines initially had serious reliability problems, and a 1903 attempt to sail around the Isle of Wight on the surface resulted in four of the boats breaking down before covering much more than 4 miles (6.4 km).

The Holland class were mostly used for testing, but in October 1904, after a Russian fleet mistakenly sank a number of British fishing vessels in the Dogger Bank incident, the Holland boats left harbour to attack the fleet. They were recalled before any engagement could take place.

== Boats ==
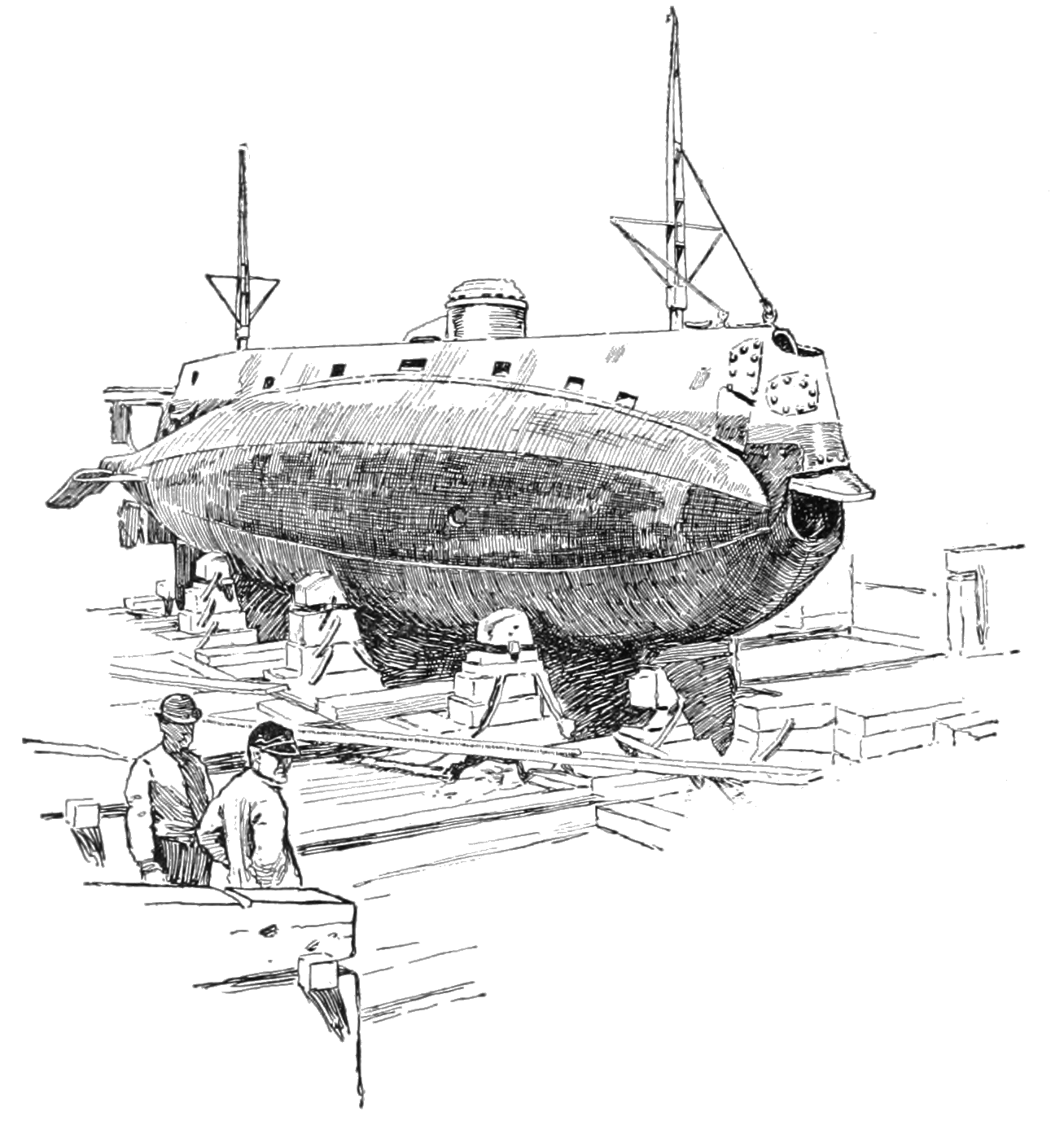
Holland 1 submarine in dry dock

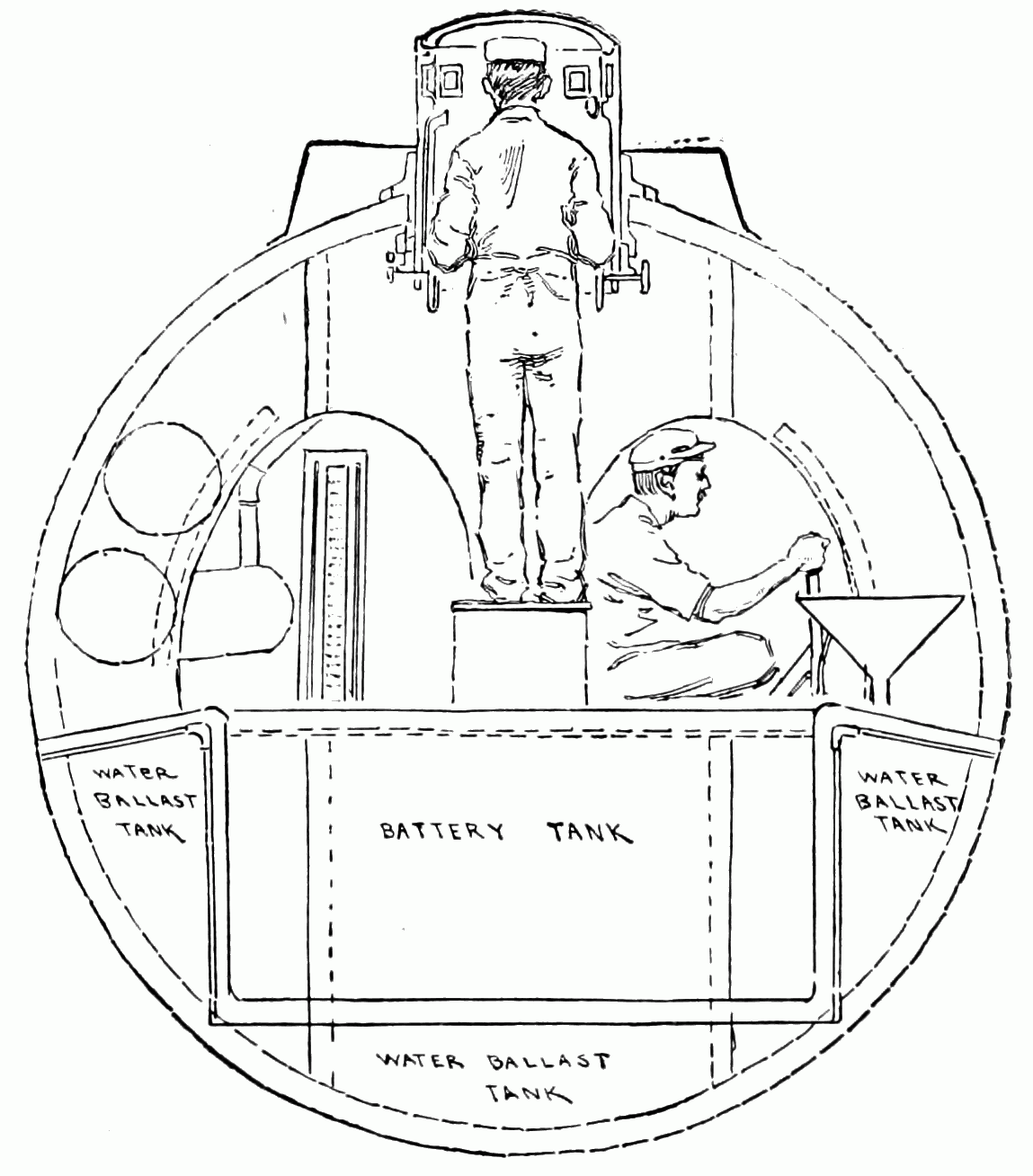
Holland 1 submarine cross section

- Holland 1, launched on 2 October 1901 in secret. Now on display at the Royal Navy Submarine Museum in Gosport.
- Holland 2, launched February 1902, sold 7 October 1913.
- Holland 3, commissioned 1 August 1902, sank in trials in 1911, and sold October 1913.
- Holland 4, launched 23 May 1902, foundered 3 September 1912, salvaged and sunk as a gunnery target 17 October 1914.
- Holland 5, launched 10 June 1902, lost 1912 off the Sussex Coast. Wreck site designated under the Protection of Wrecks Act 1973 4 January 2005.
