= Holland-class submarine (disambiguation) =

Holland-class submarines were the first submarines built for the Royal Navy.

Holland-class submarine may also refer to:

- Holland 602 type submarine, or H-class submarine, a submarine type in use in World War I
  - American Holland-class submarine, of the Russian Navy
- "Holland"-type submarine, the S-1 group of United States S-class submarines, after World War I
