= HMS Alliance (P417) =

Amphion class submarine of the Royal Navy

Coordinates: 50°47′18.47″N 1°07′10.94″W

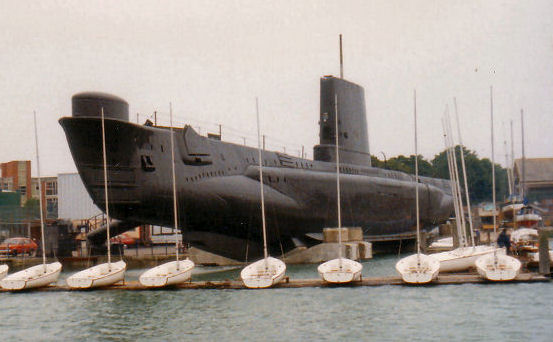
- HMS Alliance on display at Royal Navy Submarine Museum, Gosport, Hampshire

History

United Kingdom
- Ordered: 1943 Emergency war programme
- Builder: Vickers Armstrong, Barrow-in-Furness
- Laid down: 13 March 1945
- Launched: 28 July 1945
- Commissioned: 14 May 1947
- Decommissioned: 1973, static training boat until August 1979
- Identification: Pennant number: P417 (S67 from 1961)
- Status: Museum ship/memorial since 1981 at Royal Navy Submarine Museum

General characteristics
- Displacement: 1,360/1,590 tons (surface/submerged); 1,385/1,620 tons after streamlining
- Length: 281 ft 4.75 in (85.7695 m)
- Beam: 22 ft 3 in (6.78 m)
- Draught: 17 ft (5.2 m)
- Propulsion: Two 2,150 hp (at 450 rpm) supercharged Vickers 8-cylinder diesel engine, Two 625 hp electric motors for use underwater, driving two shafts
- Speed: 18.5/8 knots (surface/submerged); 18.5/10 knots after streamlining
- Range: 10,500 nautical miles (19,400 km) at 11 knots (20 km/h) surfaced; 16 nautical miles (30 km) at 8 knots (15 km/h) submerged; 90 nautical miles (170 km) at 3 knots (6 km/h) submerged
- Endurance: 36 hours submerged at 2.5 knots
- Test depth: 500 ft (150 m)
- Complement: 5 officers, 56 ratings (63 ratings after modernisation in 1960)
- Armament: Six 21 in (530 mm) bow torpedo tubes (including 2 external dry close fit); Four 21-inch stern torpedo tubes (including 2 external dry close fit); 20 torpedoes carried (externals could not be reloaded at sea); Mark V mines could be launched from the internal tubes; External tubes removed during streamlining/modernisation.; One QF 4-inch Mark XXII deck gun on S2 mounting; One 20 mm AA Oerlikon 20 mm gun on a Mark VII mounting, (briefly fitted with a twin Oerlikon on a Mark 12A mounting).; All guns removed during streamlining/modernisation.

HMS Alliance (P417/S67) is a Royal Navy A-class, Amphion-class or Acheron-class submarine, laid down towards the end of the Second World War and completed in 1947. The submarine is the only surviving example of the class, having been a memorial and museum ship since 1981.

The Amphion-class submarines were designed for use in the Far East, where the size of the Pacific Ocean made long-range, high surface speed and relative comfort for the crew important features to allow for much larger patrol areas and longer periods at sea than British submarines operating in the Atlantic or Mediterranean had to contend with. Alliance was one of the seven A-class boats completed with a snort mast - the other boats all had masts fitted by 1949.

== History ==
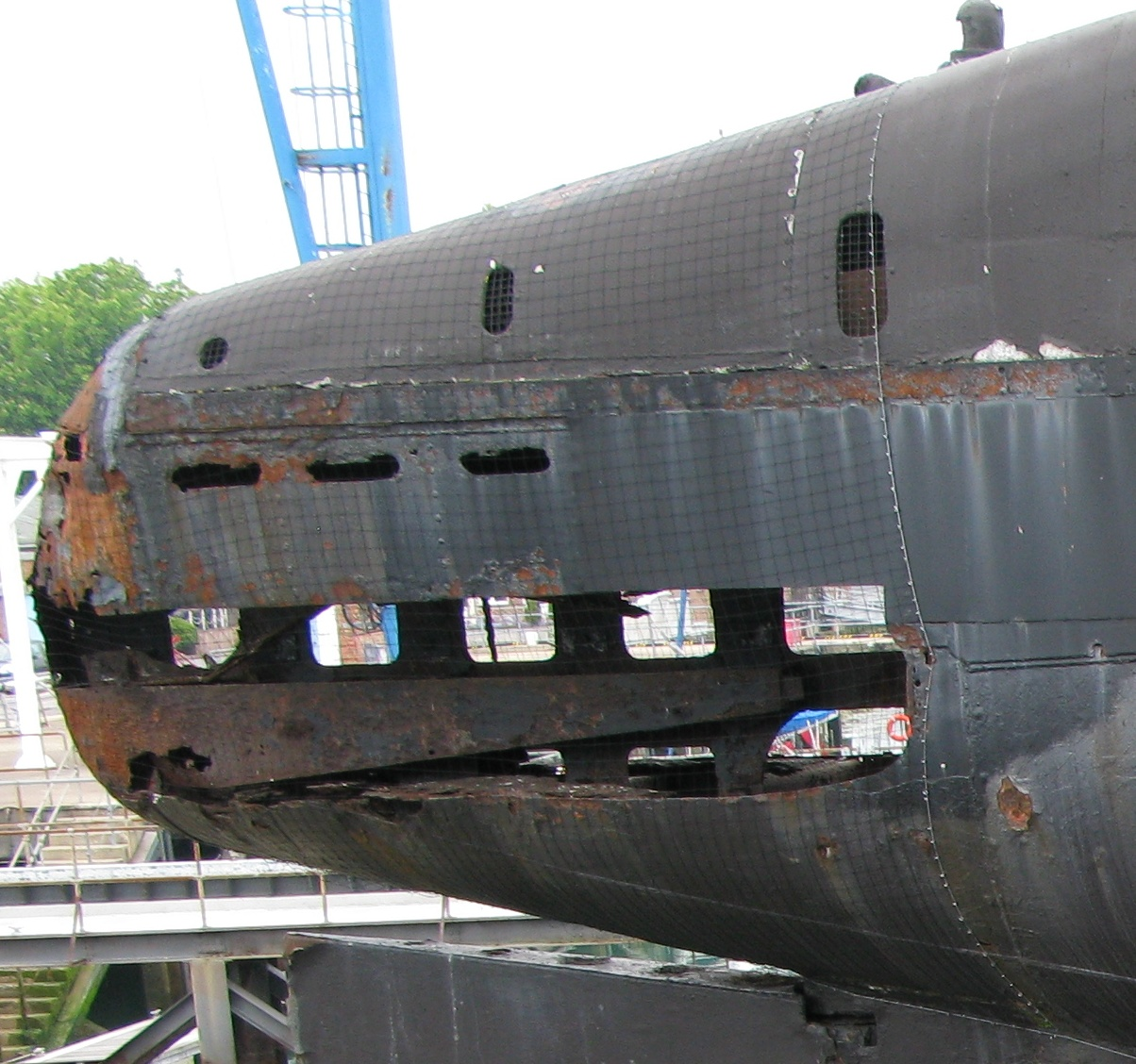
Damage to the stern of Alliance in 2008

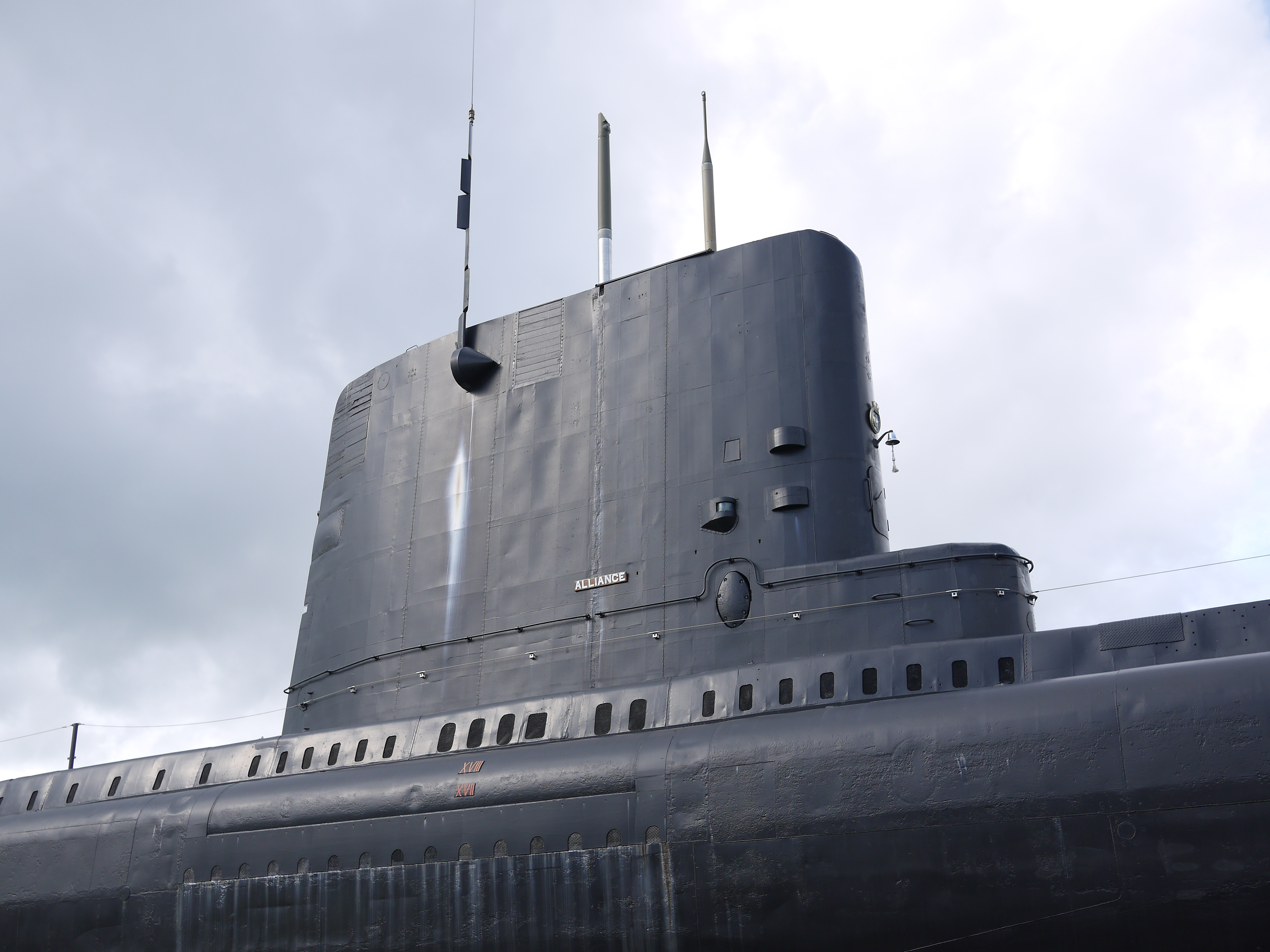
HMS Alliance's fin

From 9 October 1947 until 8 November the submarine undertook a lengthy experimental cruise in the Atlantic Ocean off the coast of Africa to investigate the limits of the snort mast, remaining submerged for 30 days.

Between 1958 and 1960 Alliance was extensively modernised by having the deck gun and external torpedo tubes removed, the hull streamlined and the fin replaced with a larger (26 feet 6 inch high), more streamlined one constructed of aluminium. The purpose of these modifications was to make the submarine quieter and faster underwater. Following the modifications, the wireless transmitting aerial was supported on a frame behind the fin but was later replaced with a whip aerial on the starboard side of the fin which could be rotated hydraulically to a horizontal position.

The original gun access hatch was retained, however, allowing Alliance to be equipped with a small calibre deck gun again when serving in the Far East during the Indonesian Confrontation of the early 1960s.

In May 1961 the pennant numbers of British submarines were changed so that all surviving submarines completed after the Second World War were now numbered from S01 upwards, and Alliance was given the number S67.

On 13 January 1968, she grounded on Bembridge Ledge off the Isle of Wight, but was subsequently refloated with the help of Admiralty tugs. On or around 30 September 1971, a battery explosion occurred on board, while she was at Portland Harbour, which killed one sailor and injured 14 others.

From 1973 until 1979 she was the static training boat at the shore establishment HMS Dolphin, replacing HMS Tabard in this role. In August 1979, she was towed to Vosper Ship Repairers Limited's yard at Southampton to have her keel strengthened so that she could be lifted out of the water and preserved as a memorial to those British submariners who have died in service. Since 1981 the submarine has been a museum ship, raised out of the water and on display at the Royal Navy Submarine Museum in Gosport.

Although listed as part of the National Historic Fleet, in recent years as many as 100 pigeons had been nesting in the submarine, causing extensive corrosive damage. She also sat on cradles over seawater, adding to problems of corrosion and preventing easy and economical maintenance to her exterior. Urgent repairs were needed and it was announced on 30 May 2011 that HMS Alliance would share in an £11 million Heritage Lottery Fund grant. Alliance would receive £3.4 million to repair her bow and stern and address extensive surface corrosion. The restoration included reclaiming land beneath HMS Alliance using a cofferdam and backfill. This provides easy access for future maintenance and a new viewing platform for visitors, additionally opening up the conning tower and casing. A new HMS Alliance gallery is also part of the project to help ensure visitors fully appreciate the significance of this submarine and what she represents.

Restoration was completed by March 2014, and the submarine was opened to visitors at the Royal Navy Submarine Museum in April.

== In popular culture ==
In 2017, the submarine was featured in the movie Transformers: The Last Knight and appeared to be a Transformer itself.

In 2020, the submarine was featured in a Weetabix advertisement.
