= HMS Haldon =

A number of ships of the Royal Navy were named Haldon, including -

- HMS Haldon (1916), a Racecourse-class minesweeper of World War I
- HMS Haldon (L19), a Hunt-class destroyer of World War II
