= HMS Hampshire =

Five ships of the Royal Navy have been named HMS Hampshire after the English county:

- English ship Hampshire (1653) was a 46-gun ship launched in 1653 and sunk in 1697 in action with the French ship Pelican in Hudson Bay during the War of the Grand Alliance.
- HMS Hampshire (1698) was a 48-gun fourth rate launched in 1698 and broken up in 1739.
- HMS Hampshire (1741) was a 50-gun fourth rate launched in 1741 and broken up in 1766.
- HMS Hampshire (1903) was a Devonshire-class armoured cruiser launched in 1903 and sunk by a mine in 1916.
- HMS Hampshire (D06) was a County-class guided missile destroyer launched in 1963 and scrapped in 1979.
