= HMS Horatio =

At least two ships of the Royal Navy have been named HMS or HMT Horatio:

- HMS Horatio (1807) was a 38-gun fifth-rate Lively-class frigate launched in 1807 and eventually broken up in 1861.
- HMT Horatio (T153) was a Shakespearian-class naval trawler launched in 1940 that was torpedoed and sunk on 7 January 1943.

== See also ==
- HMS Nelson
- HMS Lord Nelson
