= HMS Hyderabad =

Two ships of the Royal Navy have been named HMS Hyderabad :

- HMS Hyderabad (1917) the only purpose built Q-ship of World War I launched in 1917 and sold in 1920
- HMS Hyderabad (K212) a Flower-class corvette previously HMS Nettle launched in 1941 and sold in 1948
