= HMS Gozo =

Two ships of Royal Navy have been named HMS Gozo after the Mediterranean island of Gozo:

- HMS Malta (1800 schooner) was a Spanish 10-gun schooner built and launched in the United States of America in 1797. The British captured her in 1800 and renamed her HMS Gozo in December 1800. She was sold in 1804.
- HMS Gozo (J287) was a World War II Algerine-class minesweeper launched in 1943 and transferred to Great Britain under Lend-Lease. She was returned to the United States Navy in 1946. On 2 October 1948 the US sold her to the Royal Hellenic Navy, who renamed her Polemistis (M 74). The Greek navy paid her off on 10 December 1973. She was sunk as a target in 1975.
