= HMS Honeysuckle =

Two ships of the Royal Navy have borne the name HMS Honeysuckle, after the flower:

- HMS Honeysuckle (1915) was an Acacia-class sloop launched in 1915 and sold in 1922 for scrapping.
- HMS Honeysuckle (K27) was a Flower-class corvette launched in 1940 and scrapped in 1950.
