= HMS Hasty =

Six ships of the Royal Navy have borne the name HMS Hasty:

- HMS Hasty (1797) was a 12-gun gunvessel launched in 1797 and sold in 1802.
- HMS Hasty (1812) was a 12-gun gun-brig launched in 1812. She became a survey vessel in 1819, a mud-engine in 1827, and was still in service in 1870.
- HMS Hasty (1856) was an Albacore-class wooden screw gunboat launched in 1856 and sold in 1865.
- HMS Hasty (1894) was a Charger-class destroyer launched in 1894 and sold in 1912.
- HMS Hasty was a tender transferred from the War Department in 1906 as HMS Linnet (1906), renamed HMS Hasty in 1913 and sold in 1932.
- HMS Hasty (H24) was an H-class destroyer launched in 1936 and sunk in 1942 after being torpedoed by an E-boat.
