= HMS Hydrangea =

Two ships of the Royal Navy have been named HMS Hydrangea :

- HMS Hydrangea (1916) an Arabis-class sloop launched in 1916 and sold in 1920
- HMS Hydrangea (K39), a Flower-class corvette launched in 1940 and sold in 1947. She became the mercantile Hydralock and was wrecked in 1957
