= HMS Hampton Court =

Two ships of the Royal Navy have borne the name HMS Hampton Court:

- HMS Hampton Court (1678) was a 70-gun third-rate ship of the line launched in 1678 captured by France in 1707 and sold to Spain in 1712.
- HMS Hampton Court (1709) was a 70-gun third-rate ship of the line launched in 1709 rebuilt in 1744 as a 64-gun ship. She was broken up in 1774.
