= HMS Geranium =

Two ships of the Royal Navy have borne the name HMS Geranium, after the flower, the geranium:

- HMS Geranium (1915) was an Arabis-class sloop launched in 1915. She was transferred to the Royal Australian Navy in 1920, was dismantled in 1932 and sunk as a target in 1935.
- HMS Geranium (K16) was a Flower-class corvette launched in 1940 and sold to the Royal Danish Navy in 1945. They renamed her Thetis and discarded her in 1963.
