= HMS Grantham =

HMS Grantham may refer to:

- English ship Grantham (1654), a 30-gun ship launched in 1654, renamed Garland in 1660, became a fireship in 1688, upgraded to a fifth rate frigate in 1689 and finally sold in 1698.
- HMS Grantham (1787), purchased in 1787 and broken up in 1792
