= HMS Harebell =

Two ships of the Royal Navy have been named HMS Harebell :

- HMS Harebell (1918) an Anchusa-class sloop launched in 1918 and scrapped in 1939
- HMS Harebell, a Flower-class corvette ordered in 1940 and cancelled in 1941
