= HMS Genista =

Two vessels of the Royal Navy have been named HMS Genista, after the flower:

- HMS Genista (1916) was an Arabis-class minesweeping sloop built by Napier & Miller and launched on 26 February 1916. Sunk by German submarine U-57 in the Atlantic on 23 October 1916.
- HMS Genista (K200) was a Flower-class corvette launched at Harland & Wolff on 24 July 1941. It was transferred to the Air Ministry in 1947 and renamed Weather Recorder, and broken up in Antwerp in October 1961.
