= HMS Granado =

Two vessels of the Royal Navy have been named HMS Granado (or HMS Grenado, or Grenada):

- HMS Granado (1695) was launched at Dover in 1695 as a bomb vessel. She saw active service in the Nine Years' War, and was broken up in May 1718 at Woolwich.
- HMS Granado (1742) was launched at Harwich in 1742, during the War of the Austrian Succession, as a sloop-of-war. During this war, she captured a French privateer. During the Seven Years' War, she served both as a sloop and as a bomb vessel, and participated in naval operations off the coast of France and in the West Indies. After the Navy sold her in 1763, she became the mercantile Prince Frederick. Around 1775, she became the whaler Prudence in the northern whale fishery. Around 1781, she became a government transport; she was wrecked on 20 May 1782 on the coast of India.
