= HMS Hastings =

Seven ships of the Royal Navy have borne the name HMS Hastings, after the town of Hastings. Another two were planned, but renamed before entering service:

- HMS Hastings (1695) was a 32-gun fifth rate launched in 1695 and wrecked in 1697.
- HMS Hastings (1698) was a 32-gun fifth rate launched in 1698. She capsized in 1707.
- HMS Hastings (1707) was a 44-gun fifth rate launched in 1707, hulked in 1739 and sold in 1744 to become a privateer.
- HMS Hastings (1741) was a 44-gun fifth rate originally planned as HMS Endymion, but renamed in 1739 and launched in 1741. She was broken up in 1763.
- HMS Hastings (1819) was a 74-gun third-rate ship of the line, previously in service as an East Indiaman. She was purchased in 1819, converted to screw propulsion in 1855, used as a coal hulk from 1870 and was sold in 1885.
- HMS Hastings (1821) was a 32-gun fifth rate launched in 1821 and broken up in 1855.
- HMS Hastings (L27) was a Hastings-class sloop launched in 1930 and broken up in 1946.
- HMS Hastings (1956) was to have been a Rothesay-class frigate. She was transferred to the Royal New Zealand Navy in 1957 and renamed HMNZS Otago, being launched in 1958.
- HMS Hastings was originally planned as a Rothesay-class frigate. This hull was ultimately cancelled and reordered as the Leander-class frigate HMS Dido.
