= HMS Goree =

Four ships of the Royal Navy have borne the name HMS Goree, after the island of Gorée, and its capture by the British in 1758:

- HMS Goree was a 10-gun sloop launched in 1729 as the storeship hoy HMS Hayling. She was converted and renamed HMS Goree in 1759 and was broken up in 1763.
- HMS Goree (1759) was a sloop captured from the French in 1759 and paid off in 1763.
- HMS Goree (1800) was a 16-gun sloop captured from the French in 1800 and sold in 1806.
- HMS Goree was a 16-gun sloop launched in 1794 as HMS Favourite. She was captured by the French in 1806, recaptured in 1807 and taken into the navy as HMS Goree. She became a prison hulk in 1814 and was broken up in 1817.

See also

- HMS Gore (K481), a frigate in service from 1943 to 1946
