= HMS Holland 6 =

Submarine of the Royal Navy

Holland 6 was originally a Holland-class submarine. But Holland 6 had many improvements made to her, and she was classed as the first of a class of 13 boats called the British A-class submarine.

See HMS A1 for details of her career in the Royal Navy.
