= HMS Grappler =

Five ships of the Royal Navy have borne the name HMS Grappler:

- HMS Grappler (1797) was a 12-gun Courser-class gun-brig launched in 1797 and wrecked and burnt in 1803.
- HMS Grappler (1845) was an iron paddle vessel launched in 1845 and sold in 1850.
- HMS Grappler (1856) was a mortar vessel launched in 1856, renamed MV18 later that year, and hulked in 1866. She was sold in 1896.
- HMS Grappler (1856) was an Albacore-class gunboat launched in 1856 and sold into mercantile service in 1868.
- HMS Grappler (1880) was a Banterer-class composite screw gunboat launched in 1880. She became a boom defence vessel in 1904 and was sold in 1907.

== See also ==
HCS Grappler (1804) - a 14-gun brig belonging to the Bombay Marine of the British East India Company, launched in 1804, captured in 1806, recaptured in 1809, and that then disappears from the records.
