= HMS Grenade =

Two ships of the Royal Navy have borne the name HMS Grenade:

- HMS Grenade (H86) was a G-class destroyer launched in 1935 and sunk in 1940.
- HMS Grenade (G53) was a Weapon-class destroyer ordered in 1943 and cancelled in 1944 before she was laid down.
