= HMS Hong Kong =

HMS Hong Kong may refer to one of two vessels:

- HMS Hong Kong (1857), a steam tender
- HMS Hong Kong (K585), a Colony-class frigate
