= HMS Gnat =

Four ships of the British Royal Navy have been named HMS Gnat after the insect.

- The first HMS Gnat (1856) was a Cheerful-class gunboat built at Laird's shipyard and launched on 10 May 1856. She was broken up in August 1864.
- The second HMS Gnat (1867) was a composite screw gunvessel launched at Pembroke Dockyard on 26 November 1867. She was wrecked on Balabac Island in the South China Sea on 11 November 1868.
- The third HMS Gnat (1906) was a small coastal destroyer launched by Thornycroft at Chiswick on 1 December 1906 and sold for scrapping on 9 May 1921.
- The most recent HMS Gnat (T60) was an Insect-class gunboat launched by Lobnitz and Co. Shipyard at Renfrew in Scotland on 3 December 1915. She was torpedoed by a submarine on 21 October 1941 and beached at Alexandria, where she was converted to a fixed anti-aircraft platform. She was broken up in 1945.
