= HMS Handy =

Five ships of the Royal Navy have carried the name HMS Handy:

- HMS Handy (1856) was a Clown-class gunboat launched 1856, sold at Lagos 1868.
- HMS Handy was a 38-gun fifth rate launched 1812 as HMS Nymphe, on harbour service 1836, renamed Handy 1871, broken up 1875.
- HMS Handy (1882) was a Rendel gunboat (or 'flat-iron') launched 1882, used for gun trials, renamed Excellent 1891 as a gunnery training ship, renamed Calcutta 1916, renamed Snapper 1917, sold 1924, broken up 2008.
- HMS Handy (1895) was a Handy-class destroyer launched 1895, sold in Hong Kong 1916.
- HMS Handy (1939) was a H-class destroyer ordered by the Brazilian navy as Jurua, purchased by the British before launch, launched as Handy September 1939, renamed Harvester January 1940, sunk 1943.

== See also ==
- HM Tug Handy was requisitioned in 1915 while under construction, then sold in 1920 as Antonio Azambuja.
