= HMS Havant =

Two ships of the Royal Navy have been named HMS Havant, after the town of Havant in Hampshire:

- HMS Havant (1919), a Hunt-class minesweeper launched in 1919 and sold in 1922 to Thailand as HTMS Chow Praya. She was stricken in 1971
- HMS Havant (H32), a G and H-class destroyer launched in 1939 as the Brazilian Javary but purchased before completion and renamed. She was sunk in 1940
