= HMS Haughty =

At least four ships of the Royal Navy have borne the name HMS Haughty:

- HMS Haughty (1797) was a 12-gun gunboat built at Gravesend in 1797 and disposed of in 1802.
- HMS Haughty (1804) was a 14-gun gun-brig built in 1804. She was disposed of in 1816.
- HMS Haughty (1856) was an Albacore-class wood screw gunboat launched in 1856 and sold in 1867.
- HMS Haughty (1895) was a Hardy-class "Twenty-seven knotter" destroyer. She was launched in 1895 and sold for scrap in 1912.
