= HMS Hunter =

Eighteen ships of the Royal Navy have borne the name Hunter:

- English ship Hunter (1646) was a dogger captured in 1646 and sold in 1649.
- English ship Hunter (1652) was a 10-gun fire ship, previously the French sloop Chasseur, captured in 1652. She was burnt in 1653.
- English ship Hunter (1656) was a 6-gun Royalist vessel, captured by the Parliamentarians in 1656. She foundered in 1661.
- HMS Hunter (1672) was a 30-gun fifth rate captured from the Dutch in 1672. She was on the Navy List until 1677.
- HMS Hunter (1673) was a 4-gun sloop launched in 1673 and sold in 1683.
- HMS Hunter (1690) was an 8-gun fire ship launched in 1690. She was rebuilt as a 24-gun sixth rate in 1710 and was captured by the Spanish later that year.
- HMS Hunter (1739) was a 10-gun fire ship purchased in 1739 and renamed HMS Vulcan in 1740. She was hulked in 1743.
- HMS Hunter (1756) was a 10-gun sloop launched in 1756. She was captured in 1775 by an American privateer, but was recaptured in 1776 by HMS Greyhound. Hunter was declared unfit for service and sold in 1780.
- HMS Hunter (1763) was an 8-gun cutter purchased in 1763 and sold in 1771.
- HMS Hunter (1796) was a 16-gun sloop purchased, one of three ordered from builders in Bermuda in 1796 (the others being HMS Dasher and HMS Driver). She was launched in 1796, and wrecked in 1797.
- HMS Hunter (1801) was an 18-gun brig-sloop purchased in 1801 and broken up in 1809.
- HMS General Hunter was a 10-gun brig launched in 1805 and captured by the Americans in 1813.
- HMS Hunter (1856) was a Clown-class wood screw gunboat launched in 1856. She was placed on the sale list in 1869 and was sold in 1884.
- HMS Hunter (1895) was a Handy-class destroyer launched in 1895 and sold in 1912.
- HMS Hunter (H35) was an H-class destroyer launched in 1936 and sunk in 1940.
- HMS Hunter (D80) was a Bogue-class escort carrier, launched for the US Navy as USS Block Island, loaned to the Royal Navy, at first as HMS Trailer and then from late 1942 as HMS Hunter. She was returned to the US Navy in 1945.
- HMS Hunter (1945) was a Tank landing ship launched in 1945 as HMS LST 3042. She was renamed HMS Hunter in 1947, and transferred to the Ministry of Transport in 1956, being renamed SS Empire Curlew. She was broken up in 1962.
- HMS Hunter (P284) was an Attacker-class patrol and training boat launched in 1983 and sold to Lebanon in 1991.

== See also ==
- HMCS Hunter, a Canadian Forces Naval Reserve division in Windsor, Ontario
