= HMS Grafton =

Nine ships of the Royal Navy have been named HMS Grafton, while another one was planned:

- HMS Grafton (1679) was a 70-gun third-rate ship of the line launched in 1679, rebuilt in 1700, and captured by the French in 1707.
- HMS Grafton (1694) was a fire ship purchased in 1694 and sold in 1696.
- HMS Grafton (1709) was a 70-gun third rate launched in 1709, rebuilt in 1725 and broken up in 1744.
- HMS Grafton (1750) was a 70-gun third rate launched in 1750 and sold in 1767.
- HMS Grafton (1771) was a 74-gun third rate launched in 1771. She was used for harbour service from 1792 and was broken up in 1816.
- HMS Grafton (1892) was an Edgar-class cruiser launched in 1892 and broken up in 1920.
- HMS Grafton (H89) was a G-class destroyer launched in 1935 and torpedoed and later scuttled in 1940.
- HMS Grafton was to have been a destroyer. She was ordered in 1944 but was cancelled in 1945.
- HMS Grafton (F51) was a Blackwood-class (Type 14) frigate launched in 1957 and broken up in 1971.
- HMS Grafton (F80) was a Type 23 frigate. She was sold to the Chilean Navy and delivered in 2007, being renamed Almirante Lynch FF 07.

== Battle honours ==
Ships named Grafton have earned the following battle honours:

- Barfleur 1692
- Vigo 1702
- Gibraltar 1704
- Velez Malaga 1704
- Passero 1718
- Porto Novo 1759
- Dardanelles 1915–16
- Atlantic 1939
- Dunkirk 1940
