= HMS Hollyhock =

Two ships of the Royal Navy have been named HMS Hollyhock:

- HMS Hollyhock (1915) was an Acacia-class sloop launched in 1915 and sold for scrap in 1930
- HMS Hollyhock (K64) was a Flower-class corvette launched in 1940 and sunk in 1942
