= HMS Hesper =

Two ships of the Royal Navy have borne the name HMS Hesper:

- HMS Hesper (1809) was an 18-gun Cormorant-class sloop launched in 1809 and sold in 1817.
- HMS Hesper (1855) was an iron screw storeship, formerly the Hesperus. She was transferred to the navy from the Treasury Department in 1855 and sold in 1868. She became the West Indies and Panama telegraph repair steamer Investigator, operating out of Saint Thomas till at least 1876.
