= HMS Griper =

Six ships of the Royal Navy have borne the name HMS Griper:

- HMS Griper (1797) was a gunvessel launched in 1797 and sold in 1802.
- HMS Griper (1804) was a 12-gun gun-brig launched in 1804 and wrecked in 1807.
- HMS Griper (1813) was a 12-gun gun-brig launched in 1813. She was used as a 2-gun discovery sloop in the Arctic from 1824, transferred to the Coastguard in 1836, used as a target from 1856 and was finally broken up in 1868.
- HMS Griper (1855) was an Albacore-class wooden screw gunboat launched in 1855 and broken up in 1869.
- HMS Griper (1879) was an iron screw gunboat launched in 1879. She was used for harbour service from 1905 and renamed YC 373. She was made a base ship in 1923 and was renamed HMS Flora, and then HMS Afrikander in 1933. She was sold in 1937.
- HMS Griper (W112) was an Assurance-class class rescue tug launched in 1942. She was sold to the Singapore Harbour Board in 1946 and renamed Surabaja in 1962.
