= HMS Germaine =

Two vessels of the Royal Navy have borne the name HMS Germaine or Germain, in honour of Lord Germain:

- HM armed ship Germaine, of 14 guns, was a mercantile vessel that Governor Patrick Tonyn purchased in April 1778 for the East Florida Provincial Navy and renamed. He disbanded the provincial navy in 1779 and the Royal Navy commissioned her in 1779 under Lieutenant John Mowbray. The French captured her in 1781; her ultimate fate is currently unknown.
- HMS Germaine (1781) was the American mercantile brig-sloop Americain captured in 1781, taken into service as HMS Germaine, and sold in March 1784.
