= HMS Goelan =

Two ships of the Royal Navy have borne the name HMS Goelan, the Anglicization of Gouelan (French: Goéland), the Breton word for seagull:

- HMS Goelan was the French 14-gun sloop Goéland, which HMS Penelope and HMS Proserpine captured in 1793, and which was sold in 1794.
- HMS Goeland (1803) was the French 16-gun brig-sloop Goéland, launched in 1801, which was part of the capitulation on 13 October 1803 at Aux Cayes; HMS Pique and HMS Pelican were listed as the captors. Goelan was broken up in 1810.
