= HMS Galgo =

Five ships of the Royal Navy have borne the name HMS Galgo, after the Galgo Español, the Spanish greyhound:

- HMS Galgo (1742) was a Spanish privateer sloop of twelve 4-pounder (Spanish) guns and 178 tons burthen that Hampshire captured in 1742. She was sold 24 March 1743.
- HMS Galgo (1744) was a sloop of ten 6-pounder guns and 272 tons burthen, launched in 1743 as HMS Galgo. She was renamed HMS Swallow that year, but was wrecked at the end of 1744.
- HMS Galgo (1745)
- HMS Galgo (1799) was a Spanish 16-gun corvette captured in 1799 that foundered in 1800.
- HMS Galgo (1801) was the mercantile Garland, purchased in 1801 and sold in 1814.
