= HMS Guadeloupe =

Three ships of the Royal Navy have borne the name HMS Guadeloupe, after the island group of Guadeloupe:

- HMS Guadeloupe (1760) was a sloop in service in 1760 to October 1762. Condemned in Antigua.
- HMS Guadeloupe (1763) was a 28-gun sixth rate launched in 1763 and sunk to avoid capture in 1781. She was subsequently salvaged and recommissioned by the French.
- HMS Guadeloupe (1809) was a 16-gun sloop, formerly the French Nisus, which the Royal Navy captured in 1809 and sold in 1814.
