= HMS Hart =

Several ships of the Royal Navy have been named HMS Hart including:

- HMS Hart (1805), was a French schooner launched in 1789 that in 1804 was renamed Empereur and that cruised as a privateer out of Guadeloupe. The British Royal Navy captured Empereur in 1805 and took her into service. She captured numerous small merchant vessels and participated in the capture of the Danish West Indies in December 1807. The Navy sold her in 1810.loupe. The British Royal Navy captured Empereur in 1805 and took her into service. The Navy sold her in 1810.
- HMS Hart (1868), a Beacon-class gunvessel launched in 1868
- HMS Hart (1895), a Handy-class destroyer launched in 1895 and sold for scrap in 1912.
- HMS Hart (U58), a Modified Black Swan-class sloop launched in 1943. Sold to Germany in 1959 and renamed Scheer; she was scrapped in 1971
- HMS Hart (P257), the former HMAFV Stirling used as a patrol vessel at Gibraltar from 1985 until 1991
