= HMS Gardenia =

Two ships of the Royal Navy have been named HMS Gardenia :

- HMS Gardenia (1917) an Anchusa-class sloop launched in 1917 and sold in 1923
- HMS Gardenia (K99), a Flower-class corvette launched in 1940 and sunk in 1942
