= HMS Heureux =

Two vessels have borne the name HMS Heureux, both of them captured from the French. The name translates as happy.

- The first HMS Heureux (1800) was the French 22-gun privateer brig Heureux that Phoebe captured in 1800. She was taken into service and apparently foundered in 1806.
- The second HMS Heureux (1804) was a 16-gun French brig that Galatea captured in 1807; she was sold in 1814.
