= HMS Gentian =

Two ships of the Royal Navy have borne the name HMS Gentian, after the flower:

- HMS Gentian (1915) was an Arabis-class sloop launched in 1915 and mined in the Gulf of Finland, 16 July 1919.
- HMS Gentian (K90) was a Flower-class corvette launched in 1940 and scrapped in 1947.
