= HMS Godetia =

Three ships of the Royal Navy have been named HMS Godetia :

- HMS Godetia (1916) an Arabis-class sloop launched in 1916 and scrapped in 1937.
- HMS Godetia (K72), a Flower-class corvette both launched and sunk in 1940.
- HMS Godetia (K226), a Flower-class corvette originally ordered as HMS Dart, she was launched in 1941 and manned by Belgium from completion until 1944 when she was returned to the Royal Navy. She was scrapped in 1947.
