= HMS Heythrop =

Two ships of the Royal Navy have been named HMS Heythrop:

- HMS Heythrop (1917) was a Hunt-class minesweeper (1916) launched in 1917 and sold in 1922.
- HMS Heythrop (L85) was a Hunt-class destroyer launched in 1940 and sunk in 1942.
