= HMS Gurkha =

Three ships of the Royal Navy have been named HMS Gurkha, while two have been named HMS Ghurka, after a people who originate in Nepal and who serve with distinction in the British Army as part of the Brigade of Gurkhas.

- HMS Ghurka (1888) was the name assigned to Torpedo Boat No 7, launched for the Royal Indian Marine in 1888, transferred to the Royal Navy in 1892, renamed No 101 in 1901 and sold in 1920
- HMS Ghurka (1907) was a Tribal-class destroyer launched in 1907 and sunk by a mine in 1917
- HMS Gurkha (F20) was a Tribal-class destroyer launched in 1937 and sunk in an air attack in 1940
- HMS Gurkha (G63) was an L-class destroyer built as HMS Larne (G63), but renamed in 1940 after the loss of the previous Gurkha, and launched later that year. She was sunk in 1942.
- HMS Gurkha (F122) was a Tribal-class frigate launched in 1960 and sold to Indonesia in 1984, being renamed Wilhelmus Zakarias Yohannes, until being deleted in 2000

== Battle honours ==
- Belgian Coast, 1914–16
- Norway, 1940
- North Sea, 1940
- Atlantic, 1941
- Mediterranean, 1941
- Malta Convoys, 1941–42
