= HMS Hurworth =

Two ships of the Royal Navy have been named HMS Hurworth

- HMS Hurworth (L28) - a Hunt-class destroyer, launched in 1941 and sunk in 1943.
- HMS Hurworth (M39) - a Hunt-class mine countermeasures vessel, launched in 1984.
