= Royal Navy Submarine Museum =

Maritime museum in Gosport, England

Coordinates: 50.788°N 1.1195°W

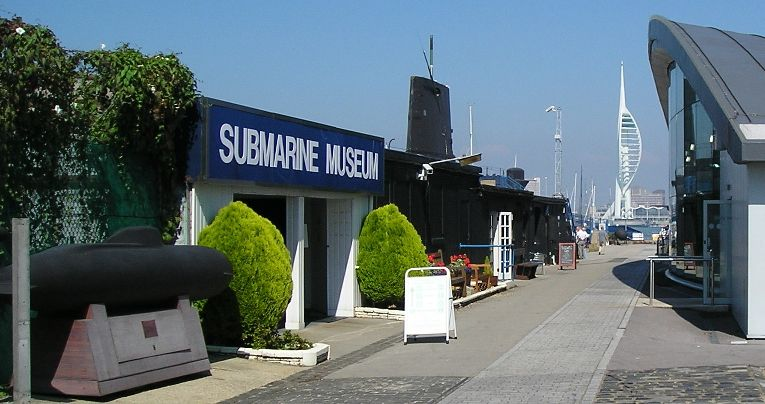
View of the Royal Navy Submarine Museum

The Royal Navy Submarine Museum at Gosport is a maritime museum tracing the international history of submarine development from the age of Alexander the Great to the present day, and particularly the history of the Royal Navy Submarine Service from the navy's first submarine, Holland 1, to the nuclear-powered Vanguard-class submarines. The museum is located close to the former shore establishment HMS Dolphin, the home of the Royal Navy Submarine Service from 1904 until 1999.

== History ==
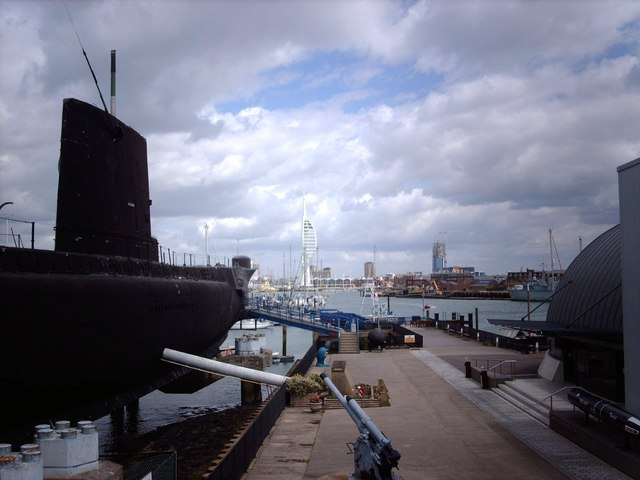
HMS Alliance

The museum's collection originated as the Submarine Branch Collection in 1963, housed above St Ambrose Church in HMS Dolphin. Few were aware of the existence of the museum, and those that were had limited access to the collection due to security considerations. The museum was officially recognised by the Ministry of Defence in 1967, along with the Fleet Air Arm Museum and the Royal Marines Museum. The museum's first full-time curator was appointed the following year.

The museum was officially registered as a charity in 1970, and has undergone significant development. In 1978 the museum was moved outside HMS Dolphin, allowing full public access. It was at this time that the Royal Navy's training and static display submarine, HMS Alliance was donated to the museum. £410,000 was raised to pay for the submarine to be lifted out of the water and put in place at the museum.

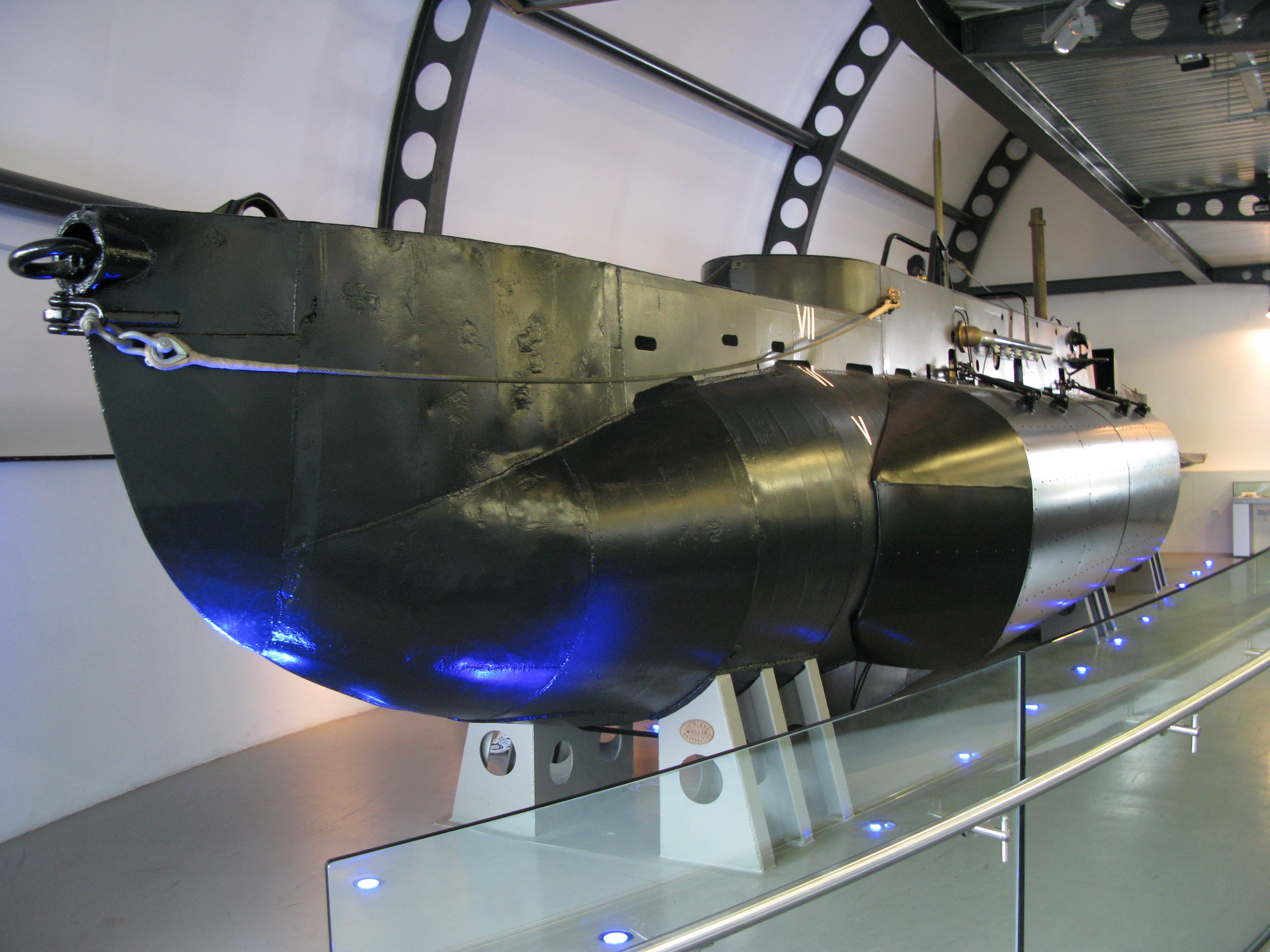
Midget submarine X24 on display

The new museum complex opened in August 1981 with HMS Alliance as the principal exhibit. Over the years since, more submarines and submarine memorabilia have been added to the collection. In 1983 the museum gained a new display building and members of the public were allowed into HMS Alliance. In 2001 the museum opened a climate-controlled building that houses Holland 1. Visitors to the museum can tour HMS Alliance with a submariner guide, explore the interactive science gallery, step on board the Royal Navy's first submarine Holland I (built in 1901), or wander around the museum exhibits.

== Submarines and other submersibles ==
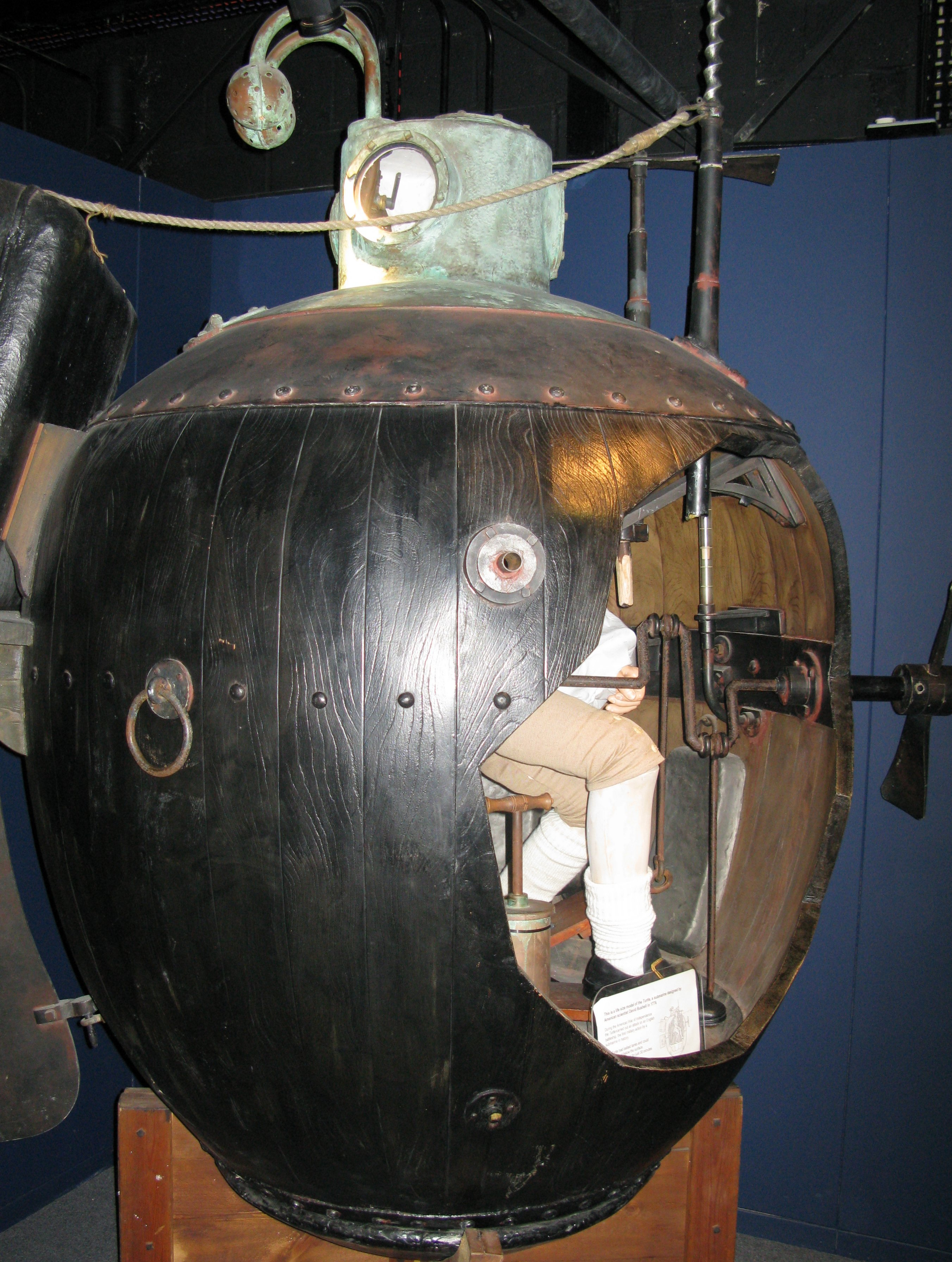
Full-size model of the Turtle submarine

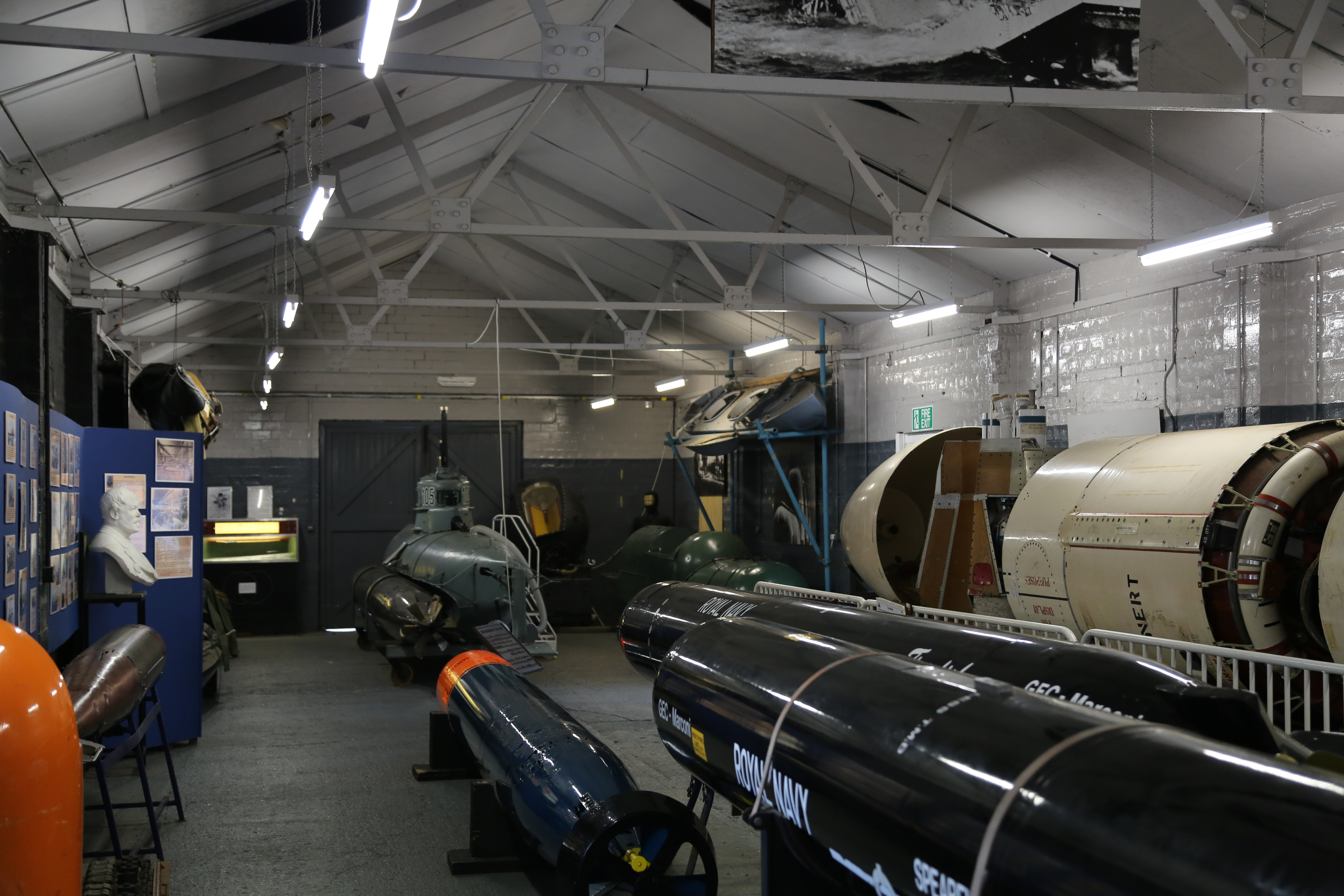
Part of one of the museum's galleries. This building has since closed to the public.

These submarines may be viewed on site

- HMS Alliance, a post-war Amphion-class hunter-killer submarine, now raised out of the water on stilts
- Holland 1 – the Royal Navy's first submarine
- X24 – the only X-craft to see service in the Second World War and survive in an intact condition.
- Biber (No.105) – German World War II midget submarine. It was restored to working condition by apprentices from Fleet Support Limited on a sandwich course in 2003 under the guidance of Ian Clark. The restoration featured on Channel 4's salvage squad.
- LR3 – a deep-sea survey and rescue submersible.
- Maiale – An Italian human torpedo
- JIM suit – atmospheric diving suit
- Cutlet – an early ROV
- Turtle – a replica of the first submarine ever used in combat

== Historic and Modern Galleries ==
Entitled "From Pirate to Peacekeeper", these include:

- A large collection of submarines and torpedoes
- the periscopes of HMS Conqueror of Falklands War fame through which one can see Portsmouth Harbour
- Remembrance Corner, which commemorates those who devoted their lives to the Submarine Service
- Submariners' medals, including the Victoria Cross of Edward Courtney Boyle
- Children's activities
  - Control Room trainer - Submarine command simulation

== Other nearby historic naval exhibits ==
- Portsmouth Historic Dockyard with its historic ships and the National Museum of the Royal Navy, Portsmouth
- Explosion! Museum of Naval Firepower

== See also ==
- Submarine Force Library and Museum (United States)
- Naval Undersea Museum (United States)
