= HMS Granado (1695) =

History

Great Britain
- Name: HMS Granado
- Ordered: 9 January 1695
- Builder: Robert & John Castle, Deptford Dockyard
- Launched: 18 April 1695
- Commissioned: 1695
- In service: 1695
- Out of service: 21 January 1729
- Fate: Broken up, Woolwich Dockyard, 1718

General characteristics
- Class & type: Serpent-class bomb vessel
- Tons burthen: 14775/94 (bm)
- Length: 64 ft 5 in (19.6 m) (gundeck); 50 ft 6 in (15.4 m) (keel)
- Beam: 23 ft 5 in (7.1 m)
- Depth of hold: 10 ft 0 in (3.0 m)
- Propulsion: Sail
- Sail plan: Ketch-rigged
- Complement: 30
- Armament: 4 × 2-pounder guns; 2 × 121/2 in. mortars

HMS Granado was a Serpent-class bomb vessel of the Royal Navy, one of ten such vessels commissioned in 1695 to support land assaults on continental ports. She saw active service in the Nine Years' War as part of the fleets commanded by Admirals Berkeley and Rooke. She was subsequently assigned to cruising duties in the Mediterranean.

In 1711 Granado accompanied her sister ship Basilisk on the British expedition along North America's St Lawrence River. In 1714 she returned to Woolwich for repairs, where she was decommissioned and placed in ordinary. She was broken up at Woolwich Dockyard on 9 May 1718.
