= HMS Hedingham Castle (K491) =

Castle-class corvette of the Royal Navy

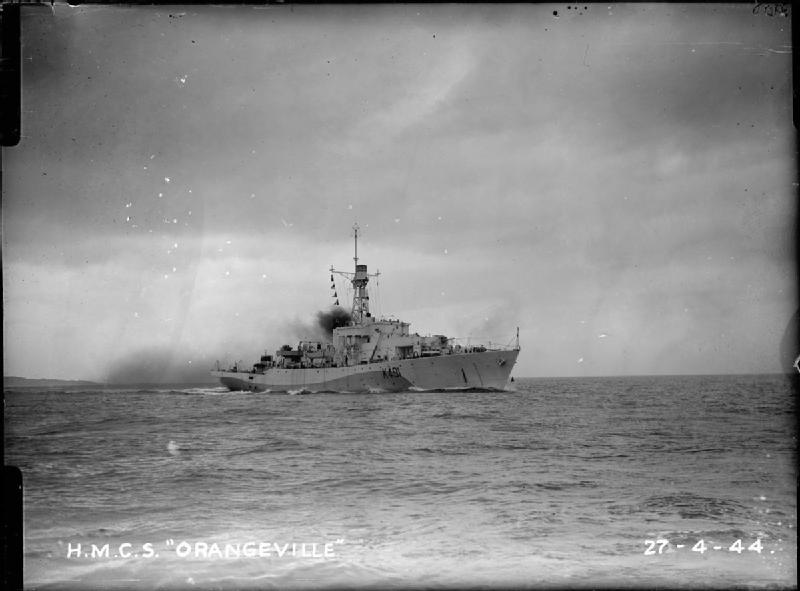
- As HMCS Orangeville in 1944

History

United Kingdom
- Name: Hedingham Castle
- Namesake: Hedingham Castle
- Builder: Henry Robb Ltd., Leith
- Laid down: 23 July 1943
- Launched: 26 January 1944
- Identification: Pennant number: K491
- Fate: Transferred to the Royal Canadian Navy

Canada
- Name: Orangeville
- Namesake: Orangeville, Ontario
- Acquired: 1943
- Commissioned: 24 April 1944
- Decommissioned: 12 April 1946
- Identification: Pennant number: K491
- Honours and awards: Atlantic 1944–45
- Fate: Sold for mercantile service 5 September 1946
- Name: Ta Tun (1946); Hsi Lin (1947–51)
- Owner: China Merchants Steam Navigation Company
- In service: 5 September 1946
- Out of service: 1951
- Fate: Taken over by Nationalist China 1951

Republic of China
- Name: Te An
- Acquired: 29 June 1951
- Decommissioned: 1967
- Fate: Discarded 1967

General characteristics (as built)
- Type: Castle-class corvette
- Displacement: 1,060 long tons (1,077 t)
- Length: 252 ft (77 m)
- Beam: 36 ft 8 in (11.18 m)
- Draught: 13 ft 6 in (4.11 m)
- Installed power: 2 × water-tube boilers; 2,750 ihp (2,050 kW)
- Propulsion: 1 × 4-cylinder triple-expansion steam engine; Single screw
- Speed: 16.5 knots (30.6 km/h; 19.0 mph)
- Range: 6,200 nmi (11,500 km) at 15 kn (28 km/h; 17 mph)
- Complement: 120
- Sensors & processing systems: Type 272 radar; Type 145 sonar; Type 147B sonar
- Armament: 1 × QF 4-inch Mk XIX gun; 1 × Squid anti-submarine mortar; 1 × Depth charge rail, 15 depth charges; 4–10 × 20 mm anti-aircraft cannon

HMS Hedingham Castle was a Castle-class corvette constructed for the Royal Navy during the Second World War. Before being completed, the ship was transferred to the Royal Canadian Navy, renamed HMCS Orangeville and used as a convoy escort for the rest of the war. Following the war, the ship was sold to Chinese interests for mercantile use and renamed Ta Tung in 1946. In 1947, the ship was renamed Hsi Lin before being taken over by Nationalist China in 1951, rearmed and renamed Te An. Te An remained in service until 1967.

== Design and description ==
The Castle class were an improved corvette design over their predecessor Flower class. The Flower class was not considered acceptable for mid-Atlantic sailing and was only used on Atlantic convoy duty out of need. Though the Admiralty would have preferred Loch-class frigates, the inability of many small shipyards to construct the larger ships required them to come up with a smaller vessel. The increased length of the Castle class over their predecessors and their improved hull form gave the Castles better speed and performance on patrol in the North Atlantic and an acceptable replacement for the Flowers. This, coupled with improved anti-submarine armament in the form of the Squid mortar led to a much more capable anti-submarine warfare (ASW) vessel. However, the design did have criticisms, mainly in the way it handled at low speeds and that the class's maximum speed was already slower than the speeds of the new U-boats they would be facing.

A Castle-class corvette was 252 feet (77 m) long with a beam of 36 feet 8 inches (11.18 m) and a draught of 13 feet 6 inches (4.11 m) at deep load. (Note: Brown states the beam at 36.5 feet (11.1 m) and the draught at 13.5 feet (4.1 m)) The ships displaced 1,060 long tons (1,080 t) standard and 1,580 long tons (1,610 t) deep load. (Note: Chesneau states the displacement at deep load as 1,590–1,630 long tons (1,620–1,660 t)) The ships had a complement of 120. (Note: Brown states the complement as 99 and Johnston states the complement of Canadian ships at 112 (7 officers and 105 ratings).)

The ships were powered by two Admiralty three-drum boilers which created 2,750 indicated horsepower (2,050 kW). This powered one vertical triple expansion engine that drove one shaft, giving the ships a maximum speed of 16.5 knots (30.6 km/h; 19.0 mph). The ships carried 480 tons of oil giving them a range of 6,200 nautical miles (11,500 km; 7,100 mi) at 15 knots (28 km/h; 17 mph).

The corvettes were armed with one QF 4-inch Mk XIX gun mounted forward. (Note: Mk XIX = Mark 19. Britain used Roman numerals to denote Marks (models) of ordnance until after World War II. This was the nineteenth model of British QF 4-inch gun) Anti-air armament varied from 4 to 10 Oerlikon 20 mm cannons. For ASW purposes, the ships were equipped with one three-barreled Squid anti-submarine mortar with 81 projectiles. The ships also had two depth charge throwers and one depth charge rail on the stern that came with 15 depth charges.

The ships were equipped with Type 145 and Type 147B ASDIC. The Type 147B was tied to the Squid anti-submarine mortar and would automatically set the depth on the fuses of the projectiles until the moment of firing. A single Squid-launched attack had a success rate of 25%. The class was also provided with HF/DF and Type 277 radar.

== Service history ==
Hedingham Castle, named for the castle in Essex, was laid down on 23 July 1943 by Henry Robb Ltd., at Leith. At some point in 1943, the ship was transferred to the Royal Canadian Navy was launched on 26 January 1944. Renamed Orangeville for the town in Ontario, the corvette was commissioned into the Royal Canadian Navy on 24 April 1944 with the pennant number K491.

After commissioning, the ship worked up at Tobermory and in May 1944, joined the Mid-Ocean Escort Force as a member of the convoy escort group C-1. Orangeville spend the rest of the Second World War as a convoy escort, with her last convoy, ONS 48 westbound to Canada. After arriving in Canada, Orangeville was sent to Liverpool, Nova Scotia for a refit in May that lasted until August. Following the refit, the ship was placed in reserve at Halifax, Nova Scotia and was paid off at Halifax on 12 April 1946.

The ship was sold on 5 September 1946 for mercantile use to Chinese interests and renamed Ta Tung in 1947. Ta Tung had a gross register tonnage of 1,387 tons. The ship was renamed twice in 1947, first as Hsi Ling, then as Shih Lin. Registered at the port of Shanghai, the ship was first owned by the Chinese government. The ship was sold to the China Merchants' SN Company in 1948. In June 1951, Hsi Lin was taken over by the Nationalist Chinese government, rearmed and renamed Te An and remained in service until being discarded in 1967. (Note: Miramar states that Te An was only stricken in 1969.)
