= HMS Hamadryad =

HMS Hamadryad may refer to:

- Spanish frigate Ninfa captured by the British in the action of 26 April 1797 and taken into service as HMS Hamadryad. She was wrecked off the coast of Portugal in December that same year.
- HMS Hamadryad (1804), the former Spanish 38-gun frigate Santa Matilda, built in Havanna in 1778 and captured by the Royal Navy frigates Donegal and Medusa in 1804 off Cadiz. Renamed HMS Hamadryad and reduced to 36 guns in 1810, served in the Baltic and Newfoundland station. Sold at Woolwich for £2610 on 9 August 1815.
- HMS Hamadryad (1823), a fifth-rate modified Leda-class frigate of the Royal Navy launched in 1823. Later a hospital ship.
- HMS Dryad (1893), a Royal Navy torpedo gunboat, renamed HMS Hamadryad in 1918 and scrapped in 1920.
