= HMS Holland 2 =

Submarine of the Royal Navy

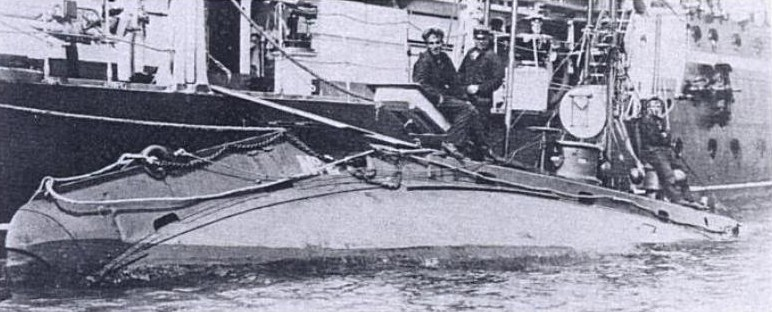
- Holland 2 alongside HMS Hazard

History

United Kingdom
- Name: Holland 2
- Builder: Vickers Maxim shipyard in Barrow-in-Furness
- Laid down: 4 February 1901
- Commissioned: 1 August 1902
- Fate: Sold on 7 October 1913

General characteristics
- Type: Submarine
- Displacement: 105 long tons (107 t) submerged
- Length: 63 ft 10 in (19.46 m)
- Beam: 11 ft 9 in (3.58 m)
- Propulsion: Petrol engine, 160 hp (119 kW); Electric motor, 70 hp (52 kW)
- Speed: 7 knots (8.1 mph; 13 km/h) submerged
- Range: 20 nmi (37 km) at 7 kn (8.1 mph; 13 km/h) submerged
- Test depth: 100 ft (30 m)
- Complement: 8 (Lieutenant, Sub-Lieutenant, Coxswain, Torpedo Instructor, Chief Engineering Artificer, Leading Stoker, Stoker, Leading Seaman and Able Seaman)
- Armament: 1 × 18-inch (450-mm) torpedo tube; up to 3 torpedoes

HMS Holland 2 was the second Royal Navy submarine to be built, and the first to be given a non-secret launch, in February 1902. Holland No. 2 was commissioned into service during the month of August 1902, at the same time as Holland 3. As such, both No. 2 and No. 3 submarines are considered the first submarines to enter formal Royal Navy operational service as due to ongoing issues, Numbers 1, 4, and 5 were not to enter service until early 1903.

Lieutenant Stephen Bowle-Evans was given formal Command of No. 2 effective the 4th of August 1902. As such, he was the joint-first formal Commanding Officer of a Royal Navy submarine, an honour shared with the simultaneous appointment of Lieutenant John Alfred Moreton appointed in Command of No. 3.

There was no ceremony for the commission of No. 2 and No. 3 submarines, as such the exact point of formal commission had over the years been misinferred as the other Holland boats. Instead, contemporary evidence more recently available shows that both No. 2 and No. 3 submarines were simultaneously accepted into formal service upon their arrival at Portsmouth on the 26th of August 1902. The remaining Holland submarines, including No. 1, were not appointed formal Commanding Officers until the 17th of January 1903.

Holland No. 2 was the second of the Holland-class submarines. She was laid down on 4 February 1901.

She set the depth record for the British Holland-class, accidentally diving to 78 feet.

In December 1902 she sustained some minor damage after a current took her off course and she accidentally surfaced directly underneath a brigantine.

She was sold on 7 October 1913.
