= HMS A1 =

Royal Navy's first British-designed submarine

Coordinates: 50.7425°N 0.9213°W

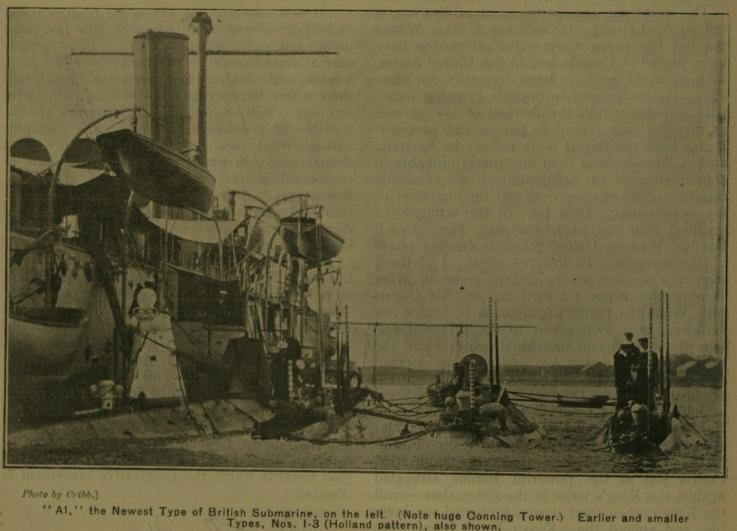
- HMS A1

History

United Kingdom
- Name: HMS A1
- Builder: Vickers, Barrow-in-Furness
- Laid down: 19 February 1902
- Launched: 9 July 1902
- Completed: 27 July 1903
- Fate: Lost, 1911

General characteristics
- Class & type: A-class submarine
- Type: Submarine
- Displacement: 190 long tons (193 t) (surfaced); 207 long tons (210 t) (submerged)
- Length: 103.25 ft (31.47 m)
- Beam: 11.9 ft (3.6 m)
- Installed power: 450 hp (340 kW) (petrol engine); 87 hp (65 kW) (electric motor)
- Propulsion: 1 × 16-cylinder Wolseley petrol engine; 1 × electric motor; 1 × shaft
- Speed: 11.5 kn (13.2 mph; 21.3 km/h) (surfaced); 7 kn (8.1 mph; 13 km/h) (submerged)
- Range: 500 nmi (580 mi; 930 km) at 11.5 kn (13.2 mph; 21.3 km/h) (surfaced); 20 nmi (23 mi; 37 km) at 5 kn (5.8 mph; 9.3 km/h) (submerged)
- Complement: 11 (2 officers and 9 ratings)
- Armament: 2 × 18 in (450 mm) torpedo tubes (bow, four torpedoes)

HMS A1 was the Royal Navy's first British-designed submarine, and their first to suffer fatal casualties.

She was the lead ship of the first British A-class submarines and the only one to have a single bow torpedo tube. She was actually sunk twice: first in 1904 when she became the first submarine casualty, with the loss of all hands; however, she was recovered, but sank again in 1911, this time when she was unmanned. The wreck was discovered in 1989 and was designated under the Protection of Wrecks Act in 1998. The wreck is a Protected Wreck managed by Historic England.

== Design and construction ==
She was an enlarged and improved Holland-class submarine–40 ft (12 m) longer than the Royal Navy's five "Holland"-type boats. Subsequent A-class boats were even larger and differed from her in several respects.

Like all members of her class, she was built at Vickers, Barrow-in-Furness. She was laid down on 19 February 1902 and launched on 9 July 1902.

Before she left the yard she suffered from a hydrogen explosion. Later while under tow to Portsmouth to join with the rest of the navy's submarines, seawater managed to reach her batteries, which gave off chlorine gas, forcing the evacuation of the vessel.

== Casualty, recovery, loss and rediscovery ==
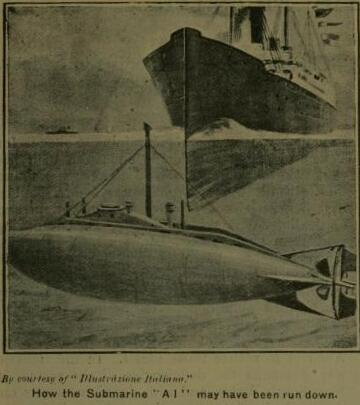
1904 illustration of the loss

She was accidentally sunk in the Solent on 18 March 1904 whilst carrying out a practice attack on the protected cruiser HMS Juno by being struck on the starboard side of the conning tower by a mail steamer, SS Berwick Castle, which was en route from Southampton to Hamburg. She sank in only 39 ft (12 m) of water, but the boat flooded and the entire crew was drowned. One consequence was that all subsequent Royal Navy submarines were equipped with a watertight hatch at the bottom of the conning tower. The casualties were buried at Haslar Royal Naval Cemetery.

She was raised on 18 April 1904 and repaired and re-entered service. Following a petrol explosion in August 1910, she was converted to a testbed for the Admiralty's Anti-Submarine Committee. She was lost a year later when running submerged but unmanned under automatic pilot. Although the position of her sinking was known at the time, all efforts to locate her were fruitless. It was not until 1989 that the wreck was discovered by a local fisherman at Bracklesham Bay, approximately 5 mi (8.0 km) away. It is thought that she was only partially flooded when she sank, and the resulting partial buoyancy meant that the wreck moved in the strong local currents. The wreck was designated under the Protection of Wrecks Act on 26 November 1998 and redesignated to extend the area covered on 5 October 2004.
