= HMS Hedingham Castle (K529) =

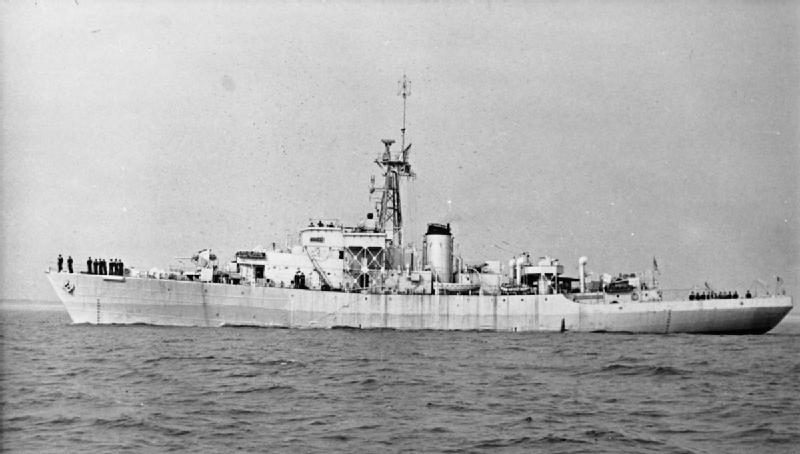
- Hedingham Castle

History

United Kingdom
- Name: Hedingham Castle
- Namesake: Hedingham Castle
- Builder: John Crown & Sons
- Laid down: 2 November 1943
- Launched: 30 October 1944
- Decommissioned: August 1945
- Identification: Pennant number: K529
- Fate: Scrapped, April 1958

General characteristics (as built)
- Class & type: Castle-class corvette
- Displacement: 1,010 long tons (1,030 t) (standard)
- Length: 252 ft (76.8 m)
- Beam: 33 ft (10.1 m)
- Draught: 13 ft 9 in (4.2 m) (deep load)
- Installed power: 2 Admiralty 3-drum boilers; 2,880 ihp (2,150 kW)
- Propulsion: 1 shaft, 1 triple-expansion engine
- Speed: 16.5 knots (30.6 km/h; 19.0 mph)
- Range: 6,500 nmi (12,000 km; 7,500 mi) at 15 knots (28 km/h; 17 mph)
- Complement: 99
- Sensors & processing systems: Type 145 and Type 147 ASDIC; Type 272 search radar; HF/DF radio direction finder
- Armament: 1 × QF 4 in (102 mm) DP gun; 2 × twin, 2 × single 20 mm (0.8 in) AA guns; 1 × 3-barrel Squid anti-submarine mortar; 1 × depth charge rail and 2 throwers; 15 depth charges

HMS Hedingham Castle was a Castle-class corvette built for the Royal Navy during the Second World War. Completed just after Germany surrendered in May 1945, the ship was reduced to reserve in August, but was reactivated a few months later. She became a training ship in January 1949 until the ship was again placed in reserve in 1956. Hedingham Castle was sold for scrap the following year and was broken up beginning in April 1958.

== Design and description ==
The Castle-class corvette was a stretched version of the preceding Flower class, enlarged to improve seakeeping and to accommodate modern weapons. The ships displaced 1,010 long tons (1,030 t) at standard load and 1,510 long tons (1,530 t) at deep load. The ships had an overall length of 252 feet (76.8 m), a beam of 36 feet 9 inches (11.2 m) and a deep draught of 13 feet 9 inches (4.2 m). They were powered by a four-cylinder triple-expansion steam engine driving one propeller shaft using steam provided by two Admiralty three-drum boilers. The engine developed a total of 2,880 indicated horsepower (2,150 kW) and gave a speed of 16.5 knots (30.6 km/h; 19.0 mph). The Castles carried enough fuel oil to give them a range of 6,500 nautical miles (12,000 km; 7,500 mi) at 15 knots (28 km/h; 17 mph). The ships' complement was 99 officers and ratings.

The Castle-class ships were equipped with a single QF 4-inch (102 mm) Mk XVI dual-purpose gun forward, but their primary weapon was their single three-barrel Squid anti-submarine mortar. This was backed up by one depth charge rail and two throwers for 15 depth charges. The ships were fitted with two twin and a pair of single mounts for 20-millimetre (0.8 in) Oerlikon AA guns. Provision was made for a further four single mounts if needed. They were equipped with Type 145Q and Type 147B ASDIC sets to detect submarines by reflections from sound waves beamed into the water. A Type 272 search radar and a HF/DF radio direction finder rounded out the Castles' sensor suite.

== Construction and career ==
Named after Hedingham Castle in Essex, Hedingham Castle was ordered on 9 December 1942 under the name Gorey Castle (after Mont Orgueil in Jersey), but was renamed sometime in 1943. The ship was laid down at John Crown & Sons in Sunderland on 2 November 1943 and launched on 30 October 1944 before being commissioned on 12 May 1945, four days after Germany surrendered. Nonetheless, she was assigned to Western Approaches Command's Anti-Submarine Training School at Tobermory, Mull, for three weeks after working up. Hedingham Castle was briefly placed in reserve from August to October at Chatham. She was reactivated that month for air-sea rescue duties under Rosyth Command and was then assigned to the 3rd Escort Flotilla, based at Portland Harbour in 1946. In June 1947 the ship made a port visit to Harwich so she could be visited by the residents of Castle Hedingham who had adopted her. Hedingham Castle was assigned to the 2nd Training Flotilla in January 1949 at Portland.

In 1953 she took part in the Fleet Review to celebrate the Coronation of Queen Elizabeth II. The ship was again placed in reserve in 1956, albeit at Plymouth, and was sold for scrap on 21 October 1957. Hedingham Castle arrived at Granton in April 1958 to begin demolition.

== Bibliography ==
- Campbell, N. J. M. (1980). "Great Britain (including Empire Forces)". In Chesneau, Roger (ed.). Conway's All the World's Fighting Ships 1922–1946. Conway Maritime Press. pp. 2–85. ISBN 0-85177-146-7.
- Colledge, J. J.; Warlow, Ben & Bush, Steve (2020). Ships of the Royal Navy: The Complete Record of all Fighting Ships of the Royal Navy from the 15th Century to the Present (5th revised and updated ed.). Seaforth Publishing. ISBN 978-1-5267-9327-0.
- Goodwin, Norman; compiled by (2007). Castle Class Corvettes: An Account of the Service of the Ships and of Their Ships' Companies. Maritime Books. ISBN 978-1-904459-27-9.
- Lenton, H. T. (1998). British & Empire Warships of the Second World War. Naval Institute Press. ISBN 1-55750-048-7.
