= HMS Holland 4 =

Submarine of the Royal Navy

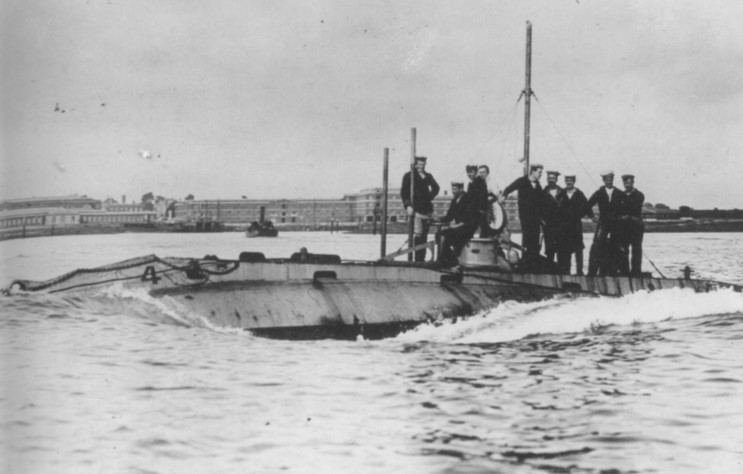
- HMS Holland 4 underway at Portsmouth, England.

History

United Kingdom
- Name: Holland 4
- Builder: Vickers Maxim shipyard in Barrow-in-Furness
- Laid down: 1902
- Launched: 23 May 1902
- Commissioned: 2 August 1903
- Stricken: 1912
- Fate: Foundered 3 September 1912; Salvaged; Sunk as target 17 October 1914

General characteristics
- Type: Submarine
- Displacement: 105 long tons (107 t) submerged
- Length: 63 ft 10 in (19.46 m)
- Beam: 11 ft 9 in (3.58 m)
- Propulsion: Petrol engine, 160 hp (119 kW); Electric motor, 70 hp (52 kW)
- Speed: 7 knots (8.1 mph; 13 km/h) submerged
- Range: 20 nmi (37 km) at 7 kn (8.1 mph; 13 km/h) submerged
- Test depth: 100 ft (30 m)
- Complement: 8 (Lieutenant, Sub-Lieutenant, Coxswain, Torpedo Instructor, Chief Engineering Artificer, Leading Stoker, Stoker, Leading Seaman and Able Seaman)
- Armament: 1 × 18-inch (450-mm) torpedo tube; up to 3 torpedoes

Holland-class submarine No 4 was built by Vickers, at Barrow in Furness, Cumbria, England. She was laid down in 1902 and launched on 23 May 1902. After successfully completing deep sea trials in the Irish Sea in August 1902, she was commissioned into the Royal Navy on 2 August 1903.

In 1905 the submarine was fitted with a conning tower, becoming the only member of the Holland-class to be receive this modification. She was stricken from service in 1912 and foundered on 3 September 1912. She was later salvaged and used as a gunnery target on 17 October 1914.
