= HMS Holland 1 =

Submarine of the Royal Navy

- Holland 1 under way

History

United Kingdom
- Name: Holland 1
- Ordered: 1900
- Builder: Vickers Maxim shipyard; in Barrow-in-Furness
- Laid down: 1900
- Launched: 2nd October 1901 Yacht Shed No 1
- Commissioned: August 26th 1902 for target practice, 1903 for operations
- Decommissioned: 5 November 1913
- Fate: Lost while under tow, subsequently raised; ultimately a museum ship
- Status: On display at Royal Navy Submarine Museum, Gosport

General characteristics
- Type: Submarine
- Displacement: 105 long tons (107 t) submerged
- Length: 63 ft 10 in (19.46 m)
- Beam: 11 ft 9 in (3.58 m)
- Propulsion: Otto Gas Engine Works petrol engine, 160 hp (119 kW); Electric motor, 70 hp (52 kW)
- Speed: 7 knots (8.1 mph; 13 km/h) submerged
- Range: 20 nmi (37 km) at 7 kn (8.1 mph; 13 km/h) submerged
- Test depth: 100 ft (30 m)
- Complement: 9 (Lieutenant, Sub-Lieutenant, Coxswain, Torpedo Instructor, Chief Engineering Artificer, Leading Stoker, Stoker, Leading Seaman and Able Seaman)
- Armament: 1 × 18-inch (450-mm) torpedo tube; up to 3 torpedoes

Holland 1 (or HM submarine Torpedo Boat No 1) is the first submarine owned by the Royal Navy.

The first in a five-boat batch of the Holland-class submarine, launched in 1901, she was lost twelve years later in 1913 while under tow to be scrapped following her decommissioning. Recovered in 1982, she was put on display at the Royal Navy Submarine Museum, Gosport. The battery bank found in the boat was discovered to be functional after being cleaned and recharged.

The first three officers of the Royal Navy to enter the embryonic Submarine Service were appointed on the 20th August 1901. Lieutenant Stephen Bowle-Evans (Navigator), Lieutenant Forster Delafield Arnold-Forster (Torpedo) and Captain Reginald Hugh Spencer Bacon (Inspecting Officer). They were shortly thereafter joined by Lieutenant John Alfred Moreton in early October 1901. Each of these officers served, in varying roles, on the crew of HMS Holland 1, making them the Royal Navy's first Submarine Service officers.

HMS Holland 1 remained under the informal command of Captain Frank Cable, an American civilian attached to her to train the Royal Navy crews for the initial duration of her trials and experiments. She was not appointed a formal Royal Navy Commander until after January 17th 1903, though the exact date remains unclear.

== History ==
She was ordered in 1901 from John Philip Holland and built at Barrow-in-Furness. Her keel was laid down 4 February 1901. In order to keep the boat's construction secret, she was assembled in a building labelled "Yacht Shed", and the parts that had to be fabricated in the general yard were marked for "pontoon no 1". She was launched on 2 October 1901 and dived for the first time (in an enclosed basin) on 20 March 1902. Her sea trials began in April 1902.

At the end of August 1902, submarine boats Holland 1, Holland 2 and Holland 3 were taken into formal control of the Admiralty. At this stage, Holland 1 was not appointed a Commanding Officer as she was taken away to be used in anti-submarine tactic trials, where she was used as target practice.

It had previously been thought that Holland 1 had suffered an explosion on 3 March 1903 that caused four injuries, however this is now understood to have been Holland 2. A petrol gas explosion seriously wounded four crew members, and the Commanding Officer of the craft, Lieutentant Bowle-Evans, contemporaneously is described as having entered the craft and dragging out the injured men, in turn being injured himself. He was later commended for this action.

Despite being the first submarine craft owned by the Royal Navy, and being subject to many trials, she did not formally commission into Royal Navy service until early 1903 due to extended issues. Iterative design improvements had taken place across the Holland submarines, as such, they were able to enter service before Holland 1. The first to enter service were Holland 2 and Holland 3.

The overall trials and development works were overseen by Capt. Bacon, and while literature as far back as the 1980s had suggested that Lieutenant Arnold-Forster had been afforded Command of Holland 1, this was not the case. Captain Bacon himself at the time noted that Captain Cable, the second American civilian sent across to assist in training the first Royal Navy crew, retained charge of the craft during the initial phase of the Hollands trials up to his departure for America on the morning of 8 April 1902. Lieutenant Arnold-Forster left the submarine service on the 5th of June 1902. On the 3rd of June 1902, Lt. Stephen Bowle-Evans, one of the first three Submarine Service officers, had ceased to be formally appointed Navigation duties, likely to assume a leadership role over HMS Holland 2, of which he would assume formal command appointment on the 4th of August 1902.

HMS Holland 1 was operated in a dynamic manner, with each crew member taking upon several roles. Lieutenants Forster (Torpedo Specialist), Bowle-Evans (Navigator) and Moreton had served in several capacities on board, with Bowle-Evans being described in contemporary first-hand accounts as "steering" the craft. Contemporary sources also place Bowle-Evans as the submarine's master entering a naval dock yard in April 1902 during this initial experimental phase. Many of the initial journeys were accompanied by American technical staff who were qualified in the operation of the craft.

Both Bowle-Evans and Moreton later were given the first formal Commands of the first two Royal Navy submarine crafts (4th August 1902), Holland 2 and 3 respectively, and are therefore the joint-first Commanders of Royal Navy submarine boats. Bowle-Evans had been a member of the experimental group since the very beginning (20th August 1901) with Arnold-Forster - it was not until the 7th of October 1901 that Moreton received his appointment to the group. Holland 2 and 3 were the first to commission into formal service, contemporarily having been considered to have entered operational service on the 26th of August 1902, several months before Holland 1, 4 and 5 were appointed Commanders (17th January 1903) and commissioned.

On 24 October 1904, with the rest of the Holland fleet and three A-class boats, Holland 1 sailed from Portsmouth to attack a Russian fleet that had mistakenly sunk a number of British fishing vessels in the North Sea in the Dogger Bank incident. The boats were recalled before any attack could take place.

The submarine was decommissioned and sold in 1913 to Thos. W. Ward for £410. By the time the submarine was sold she was considered so obsolete that she was sold with all fittings intact, and the only requirement put on the purchaser was that the torpedo tube be put out of action.

== Loss ==
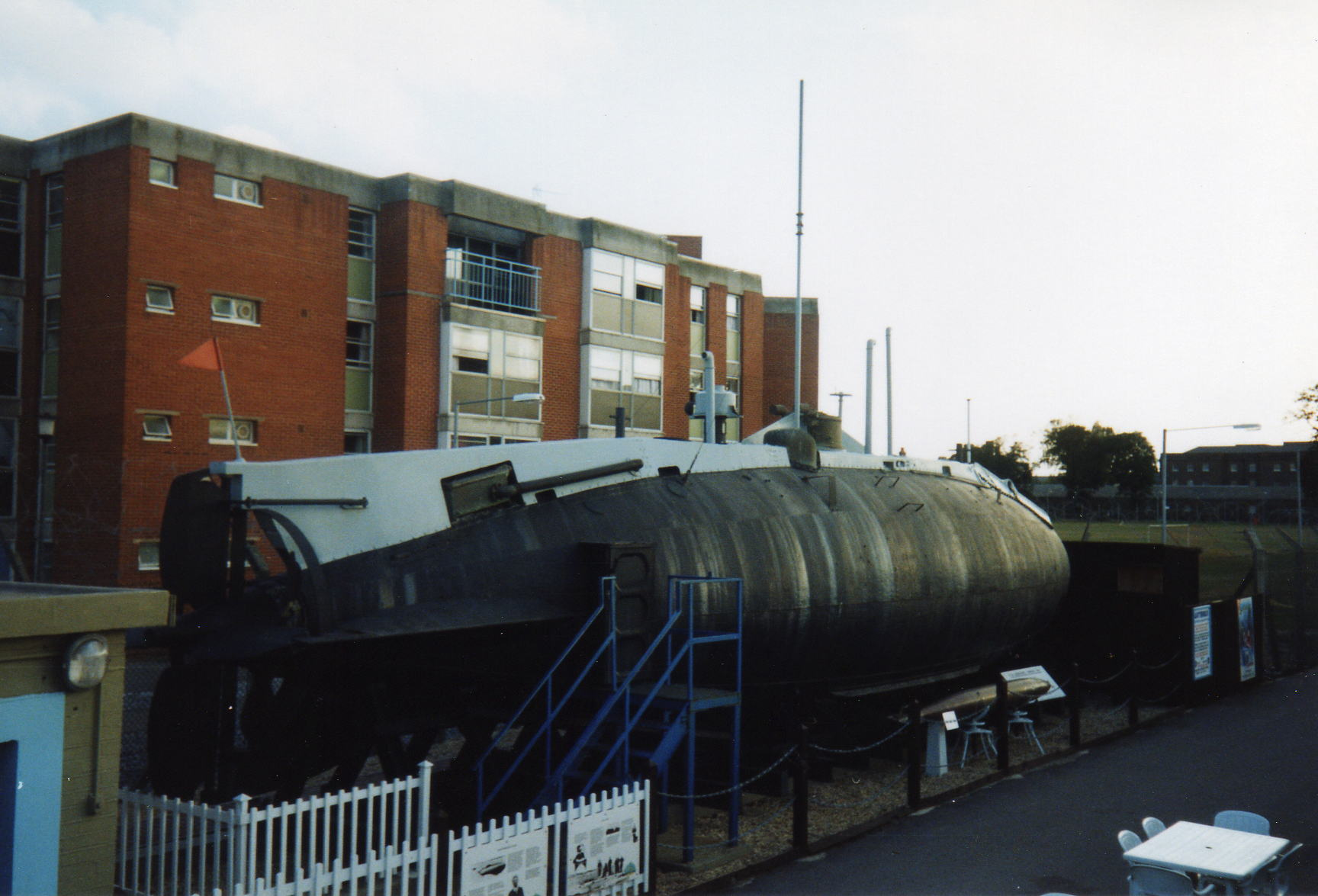
Holland 1 in 1991

While being towed to the scrapyard, Holland 1 encountered very severe weather and sank about a mile and a half off Eddystone Lighthouse. No one was on board the submarine at the time, and, since the submarine had been seen to be sinking earlier in the journey, the crew of the tug were ready to release the tow rope, preventing any damage to the tug.

== Recovery ==
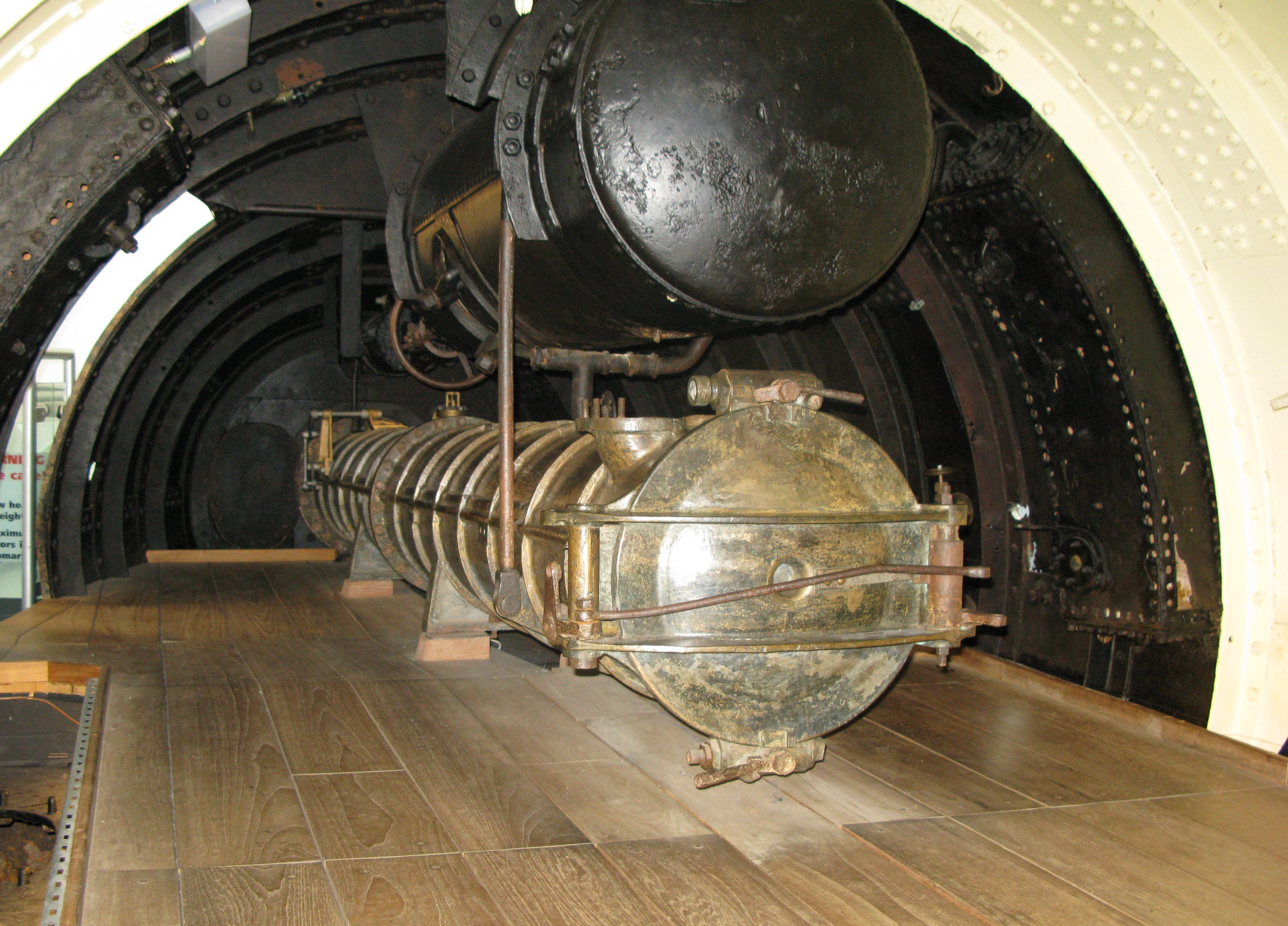
The torpedo tube on Holland 1

The wreck was located in 1981 by Plymouth historian Michael Pearn and she was raised in November 1982. From 1983, after coating in anti-corrosion chemicals, she was displayed at the Royal Navy Submarine Museum. Work on restoring the submarine continued until September 1988. A talking figure was included to explain the details of the craft to visitors. However, by 1993 it was apparent that the anti-corrosion treatment had proved inadequate. A fibreglass tank was built around her, and she was immersed in sodium carbonate solution from 1995. After four years the corrosive chloride ions had been removed, and she was able to be displayed again after restoration work.

Listed as part of the National Historic Fleet, in 2001, on her centenary, a new purpose-built climate-controlled building was opened by Countess Mountbatten. In the same year the Royal Mail put a photo of the submarine on a 65 pence stamp. In 2011 the submarine was given an Engineering Heritage Award by the Institution of Mechanical Engineers

The original bank of batteries, recovered with the wreckage, were submitted for testing by the original manufacturer, Chloride Industrial Batteries Ltd based in Swinton, Greater Manchester. Following the initial clean, the lead batteries were recharged and found to be in good working order. Some of the original batteries still remain in the possession of Enersys (ex-CIBL) at the Newport plant, in South Wales.

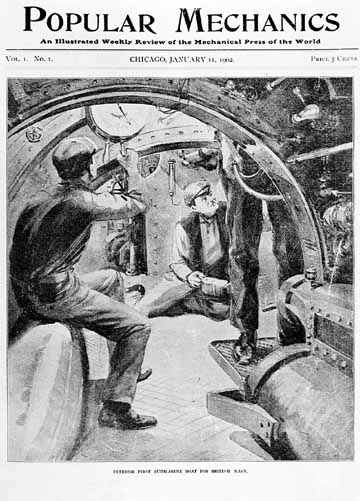
Inside the Holland 1. Cover of Popular Mechanics, January 1902.

== See also ==
- Holland I
- Fenian Ram
- Royal Navy Submarine Service
