= HMS Holland 3 =

Submarine of the Royal Navy

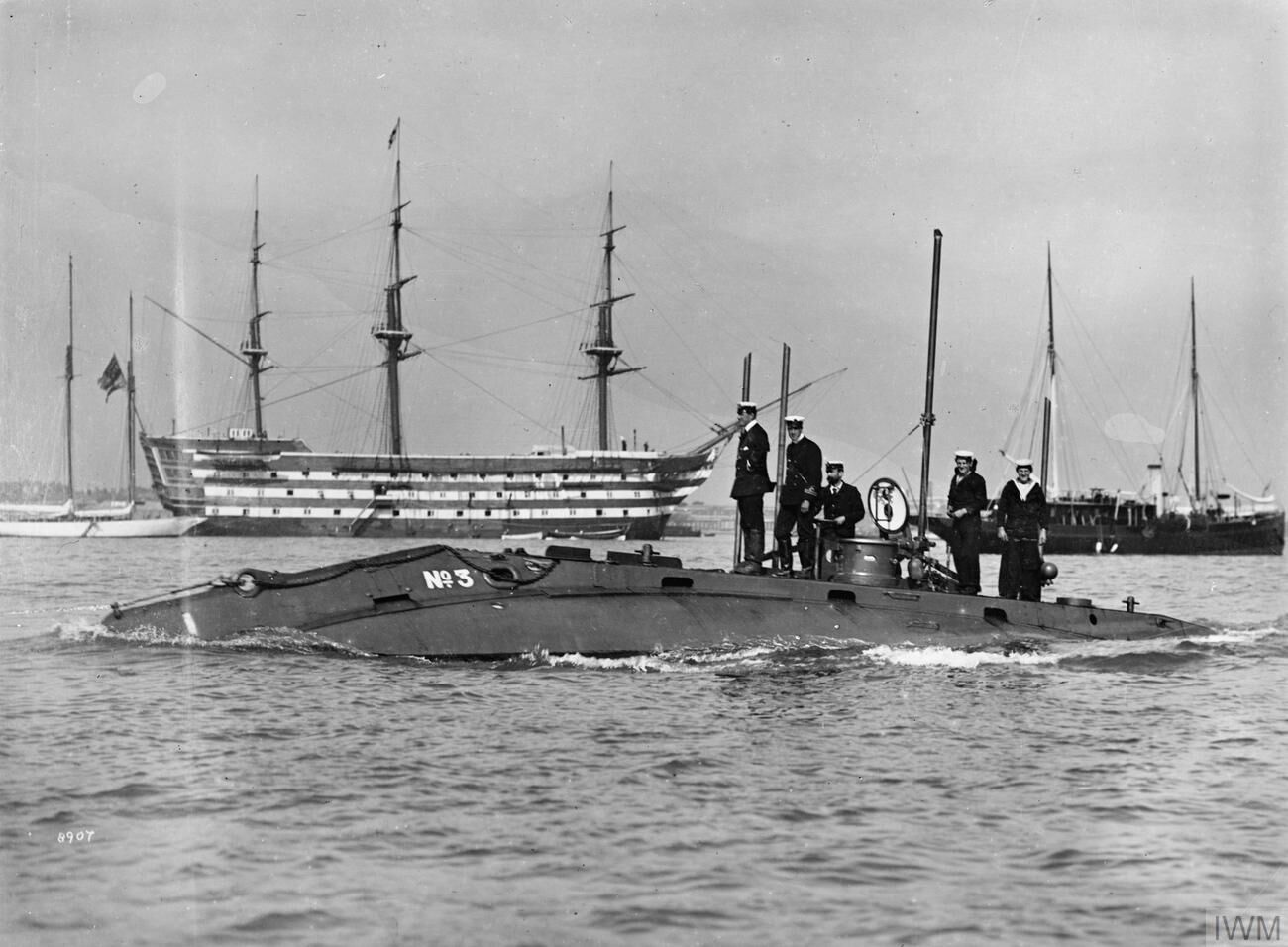
- Holland 3 at Portsmouth in September 1902, with HMS Victory in the background

History

United Kingdom
- Name: Holland 3
- Builder: Vickers Maxim shipyard in Barrow-in-Furness
- Laid down: 4 February 1901
- Launched: 9 May 1902
- Commissioned: 1 August 1902
- Fate: Sank in trials in 1911

General characteristics
- Type: Submarine
- Displacement: 105 long tons (107 t) submerged
- Length: 63 ft 10 in (19.46 m)
- Beam: 11 ft 9 in (3.58 m)
- Propulsion: Petrol engine, 160 hp (119 kW); Electric motor, 70 hp (52 kW)
- Speed: 7 knots (8.1 mph; 13 km/h) submerged
- Range: 20 nmi (37 km) at 7 kn (8.1 mph; 13 km/h) submerged
- Test depth: 100 ft (30 m)
- Complement: 8 (Lieutenant, Sub-Lieutenant, Coxswain, Torpedo Instructor, Chief Engineering Artificer, Leading Stoker, Stoker, Leading Seaman and Able Seaman)
- Armament: 1 × 18-inch (450-mm) torpedo tube; up to 3 torpedoes

Holland 3 was a Royal Navy submarine launched on 9 May 1902. The submarine was designed by Vickers at Barrow-in-Furness and was laid down on 4 February 1901. The submarine was commissioned on 1 August 1902. Holland 3 sank in trials in 1911 and was then sold on 7 October 1913.

== Service history ==
In early August 1902 John Alfred Moreton was appointed to the submarine depot ship HMS Hazard, to take command of HM Submarine No.3.

Along with Holland 5, she was one of the first two submarines to be accepted into Royal Navy service on 19 January 1903. However, by the time she was launched she was already considered obsolete and thirteen A-class submarines had already been ordered.
