= G-class destroyer (1944) =

Proposed class of British destroyers

Class overview
- Operators: Royal Navy
- Planned: 8
- Canceled: 8

General characteristics
- Type: Destroyer
- Displacement: 1,995 long tons (2,027 t) standard; 2,740 long tons (2,784 t) deep load
- Length: 365 ft (111.25 m) o/a
- Beam: 39 ft 6 in (12.04 m)
- Draught: 14 ft 6 in (4.42 m)
- Propulsion: geared steam turbines, 40,000 shp (30,000 kW) on 2 shafts
- Speed: 33.75 kn (62.51 km/h; 38.84 mph)
- Armament: 4 × QF 4.5-inch Mk I – V naval guns DP; 6 × 40 mm AA guns; 10 (2 × 5) tubes for 21 inch (533 mm) torpedoes

The G-class destroyers were a proposed class of eight destroyers of the Royal Navy ordered during the Second World War under the 1944 Programme. Two were ordered (from Yarrow) on 24 July 1944, and six more on 30 August 1944, but all were cancelled on 13 December 1945, after the end of the war.

The class was to be an improvement on the Weapon class. It has been referred to as the Gael class or Gallant class of destroyers.

== Design ==
The G-class destroyers were proposed for the Royal Navy's shipbuilding programme as a follow-on to the Weapon class. Like the Weapons, the G class were meant as a smaller destroyer, capable of being built in facilities that could not manage the larger Battle or Daring-class ships. The major change was to replace the Weapons' main gun armament of six 4-inch guns with four 4.5 inch guns in the new Mk. VI twin mountings.

The new class used the same machinery as the Weapon class, arranged in the "unit" system, with two separate boiler rooms and engine rooms, meaning that a single hit was unlikely to cause a total loss of power. Two Foster Wheeler boilers fed steam at 400 pounds per square inch (2,800 kPa) and 750 °F (399 °C) to a pair of geared steam turbines, generating 40,000 shaft horsepower (30,000 kW) and driving two propeller shafts. This was intended to give a maximum speed of 34 knots (63 km/h; 39 mph). (Note: Sources differ as to the speed of the G class, ranging from 33.75 knots (62.51 km/h; 38.84 mph) to 36.75 knots (68.06 km/h; 42.29 mph).) While the hull, with a length of 341 feet 6 inches (104.09 m) between perpendiculars and 365 feet (111.25 m) overall, was of similar design to that of the Weapons, the design's beam increased from 38 feet (11.58 m) to 39 feet 6 inches (12.04 m) to accommodate the greater top-weight of the ships' armament and fire control equipment.

The two dual-purpose (anti-surface and anti-aircraft) 4.5 inch mounts, capable of firing a 55 pounds (25 kg) shell to a range of 20,000 yards (18,000 m) (with a maximum altitude in anti-aircraft fire of 19,700 feet (6,000 m)) at a rate of 12 rounds per barrel per minute, were mounted one forward and one aft. Close in anti-aircraft armament consisted of six Bofors 40 mm guns, with two twin mounts and two single mounts. Ten 21 inch (533 mm) torpedo tubes were fitted, in two quintuple mounts.

== Ships ==
Ship	Pennant number	Builder	Laid down	Launched	Completed	Fate
Gael	G07	Yarrow	1944			Cancelled
Gallant	G03	Yarrow	1944			Cancelled
Gauntlet	G59	John I. Thornycroft & Company, Woolston	1944			Cancelled
Guernsey	G19	Denny	1944			Cancelled
Glowworm	G45	Thornycroft	1944			Cancelled. ex Gift. (Note: This vessel was originally called HMS Gift, but was renamed in October 1945 to HMS Glowworm (G45). Construction was cancelled on 12 December 1945 before completion.)
Grafton	G76	White	1944			Cancelled
Greyhound	G88	White	1944			Cancelled
Gift	G67	Denny	1944			Cancelled. ex Glowworm, ex Guinevere. (Note: This vessel was originally called HMS Guinevere but was renamed in September 1945 to HMS Glowworm, and renamed again in October to HMS Gift (G67). Construction was cancelled on 1 December 1945 before completion.)
