= HMS Storm =

Submarine of the Royal Navy

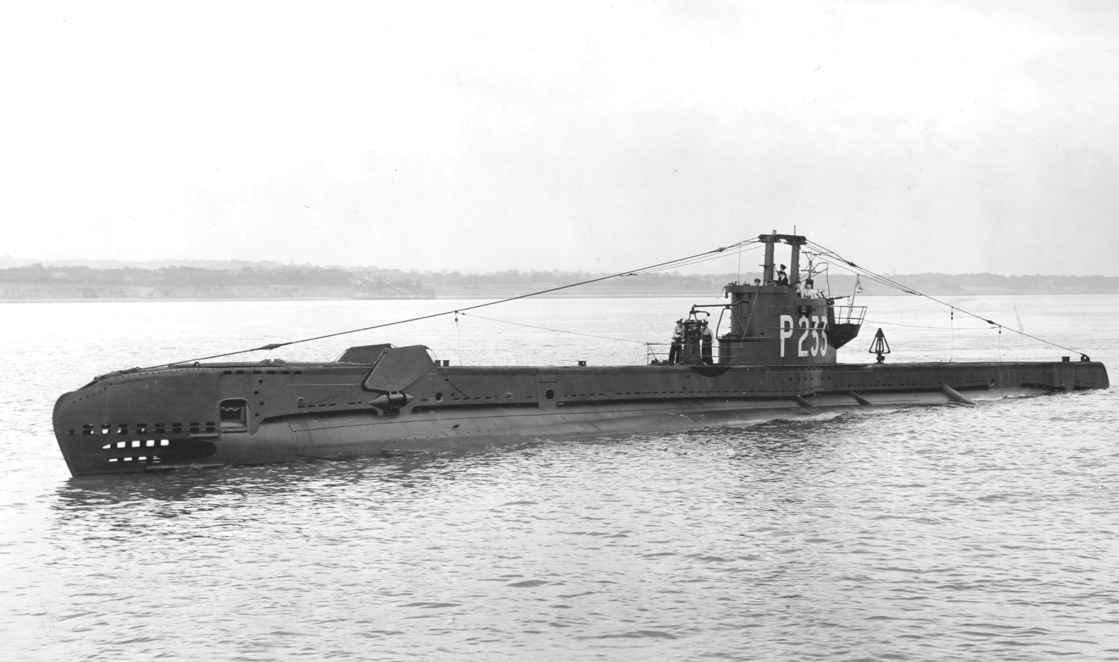
- HMS Storm

History

United Kingdom
- Name: HMS Storm (P233)
- Builder: Cammell Laird & Co Limited, Birkenhead
- Yard number: J.3067
- Laid down: 23 June 1942
- Launched: 18 May 1943
- Commissioned: 9 July 1943
- Stricken: 1949
- Fate: Scrapped September 1949
- Badge

General characteristics
- Displacement: 814-872 tons surfaced; 990 tons submerged
- Length: 217 ft (66 m)
- Beam: 23 ft 6 in (7.16 m)
- Draught: 14.3 ft (4.4 m)
- Propulsion: Diesel engines: 2x8 cylinder 950hp Brotherhoods.; Electric motors: Metro-Vickers.
- Speed: 14.75 knots surfaced; 8 knots submerged
- Test depth: 380 ft (120 m)
- Complement: 6 officers, 43 ratings (at end of wartime commission)
- Armament: 6 × forward 21 inch (533 mm) torpedo tubes, one aft; 13 torpedoes; one three-inch (76 mm) gun; one 20 mm Oerlikon cannon; three .303-calibre machine gun

HMS Storm was an S-class submarine of the Royal Navy, and part of the third group built of that class. She was built by Cammell Laird and launched on 18 May 1943. So far, she is the only RN ship to bear the name Storm.

She served in the Far East, from Trincomalee in modern Sri Lanka and from Perth, Australia. She was notable for being the first operational submarine to be commanded by a British officer from the Royal Naval Volunteer Reserve, Commander Edward Young, DSO, DSC and bar (he had previously commanded the P555 which was used in the training of crews and anti submarine ships).

== Career ==
After sea trials and working up in Holy Loch and Scapa Flow, Storm's first (and uneventful) patrol was to the Norwegian coast, north of the Arctic Circle. The day after Boxing Day 1943 she departed Holy Loch for the long passage to Ceylon (modern Sri Lanka) via Gibraltar and the Suez Canal, arriving in Trincomalee on 20 February 1944.

Her first patrol in the Far East was to the Malacca Straits between Malaya and Sumatra, both then occupied by the Japanese. Her first contact was a sighting of Japanese submarine I-165, but she was too far away for an attack. On 11 March 1944 she sank her first victim, a 500-ton coaster, with gunfire. In April she patrolled to the Andaman Islands in the Bay of Bengal south of Rangoon and on 14 April claimed her first sinking by torpedo, a 3,500-ton merchant vessel - although she did not see her sink. The following day Storm attacked a merchant ship that was escorted by what was originally identified as a destroyer, but was actually a minesweeper, plus a submarine chaser and one other anti-submarine ship. She sank the minesweeper, W-7, with torpedoes. Storm's third patrol was a so-called "cloak-and-dagger" operation, to land a local agent on an island off the northern tip of Sumatra. This ended in failure when men in an inflatable dinghy sent out to retrieve the agent from the island heard him calling from the shore at night. His voice was coming from the wrong location, and sounded strained: the dinghy retreated and Japanese machine guns and a 4" gun opened up. The dinghy occupants made it safely back to the submarine, but the fate of the agent was unknown. The fourth patrol was back to the Malacca Straits and a third victim was sunk by torpedo; this time the 3,000-ton Japanese auxiliary gunboat Eiko Maru. Following this she sighted and attacked U-1062 but without success. She began her sixth patrol by sinking a 500-ton coaster, before conducting a daylight gun raid on a small port at Mali Kyon, sinking two small escort vessels. This patrol led to the taking of a Japanese prisoner who was brought back to Trincomalee, the first such capture of the war. After this she sank three more coasters of 250-300-tons before ending her patrol.

Storm returns to Portsmouth at the end of her last patrol.

In September 1944 Storm was deployed to Fremantle in Western Australia. On her journey to Fremantle she discovered and attacked a small convoy sinking a coaster, two small escort vessels as well as damaging a further two coasters, a MGB and a MTB. The distance to the cruising grounds around Java and Celebes were so great that one of her ballast tanks was converted to carry diesel fuel in order to manage the 4,800-mile round trip. In November several schooners and other small craft carrying nickel ore were sunk. She was attacked several times on her return journey, and sighted a destroyer but held off attacking. In January 1945 Storm briefly held the record – 37 days – for a patrol by an S-class boat, covering 7,151 miles in the process. However this was her last patrol, and she received orders to return home. She finally did so on 8 April 1945, flying the traditional Jolly Roger flag to signify the end of a successful patrol. Since leaving her builders she had travelled 71,000 miles and spent over 1,400 hours under water - the equivalent of 60 days and nights.

The cover of Young's book describing HMS Storm's wartime experiences.

== One Of Our Submarines ==
Before the war Storm's Captain, Edward Young, had been in publishing, and when he returned to the trade he described his wartime service in the book One Of Our Submarines (including his account of the loss of HMS Umpire (N82)).

It was first published in 1952 by Rupert Hart-Davis, with a foreword by Admiral Sir George Creasy. The book was designed by typographer (and RNR) Ruari McLean and the endpapers feature a cross-section diagram of Storm.

The title was later issued in 1954 as the 1,000th publication from Penguin Books, and Young designed the cover. As a 21-year-old office junior before the war, Young had previously designed the famous "triple stripe" standard Penguin cover, as well as the first version of the Penguin logo. A model of HMS Storm is on display in the Royal Navy Submarine Museum in Gosport along with the medals won by its captain.

== Bibliography ==
- Colledge, J. J.; Warlow, Ben (2006) [1969]. Ships of the Royal Navy: The Complete Record of All Fighting Ships of the Royal Navy from the 15th Century to the Present (3rd Rev ed.). London: Chatham Publishing. ISBN 978-1-86176-281-8. OCLC 67375475.
- Young, Edward (30 July 1954) [1952]. One Of Our Submarines (1st ed.). London: Penguin Books.
