= History of the Royal Naval Reserve =

The Royal Naval Reserve are a part of the Royal Navy of the United Kingdom.

== Background ==
=== Impressment ===
As the Royal Navy came to its more modern organisation during the 17th century it adopted the practice of impressment to provide the bulk of the crews.

The process of impressment was not suitable for the recruiting of officers, and the procedure adopted there was that officers received a basic pay for their rank when they were holding an appointment and half of that when between appointments (half-pay). Officers in command of ships or establishments received additional 'Command money' which varied with the status of the ship or establishment involved.

=== 'Prize' scheme ===
Officers and men also received extra payments under the 'Prize' scheme. While this could arise in several different ways the most common by far was the capture of an enemy ship and its subsequent purchase by the Navy (a feasible process with wooden ships). For the ordinary sailor the amount was typically a few shillings (although this represented several months pay) but for the commanding officer it typically amounted to hundreds of pounds. Thus many captains had estates ashore which gave them an alternative income.

Junior officers were in a much more parlous state, as it was not really possible to keep a home on the half pay for a Lieutenant. This was part of the reason why marriage by junior officers was so frowned upon.

=== Volunteering campaigns ===
Impressment was eventually dropped in the early part of the 19th century in a move to encourage seamen to volunteer for full career employment in the naval service. This was fine for the numbers required during peacetime when many vessels were laid up in reserve but it meant that some means had to be provided to produce the extra men needed when the fleet expanded in time of war. An Act of Parliament of 1835 had established The Register of Seamen to identify men for naval service in the event of war, but in 1854 just 400 volunteered for duty out of 250,000 on the Register. The Register of Seamen was supplemented in 1853 with the creation of the Royal Naval Coast Volunteers (RNCV) comprising boatmen and fishermen who would undertake limited (geographic) service in the Navy during a conflict. This meant the Baltic fleet of Admiral Charles Napier was seriously undermanned for the blockade of Russia's Baltic ports during the Crimean War, and as an MP Napier campaigned for improvements in the treatment of sailors. This led to a Royal Commission on Manning the Navy in 1858 which resulted in a new Act of Parliament in 1859. This authorised the raising of a new pool of volunteer seamen from the Merchant Service and fishing fleet who would undertake annual training in gunnery with the Navy and be called out for service in the fleet by royal proclamation in time of war. By 1862 there were 12,000 volunteers in the new force.

== Establishment ==
The new force was named the Royal Naval Reserve (RNR) and was originally for ratings but in 1861 this was extended to officers who wore distinctive rank lace consisting of interwoven chain links. Officers and men ranked in seniority with but behind their Royal Navy counterparts. A number of naval hulks were moored in the major seaports around Britain to facilitate gunnery training of seamen when they came in from foreign voyages. Officers spent longer periods of up to one or two years training in shore establishments and in ships of the fleet at home and abroad to acclimatise themselves with naval practice.

== Royal Naval Volunteer Reserve ==
At the start of the 20th century with a period of rapid naval expansion taking place it was realised that the RNR could not supply the required number of trained men and a scheme was introduced that allowed men in civilian shore jobs (unconnected with the sea) to train on a part-time basis at special shore establishments, and provided the valuable experience of real time with the fleet for a few weeks a year once a certain level of competence had been achieved.

This was the Royal Naval Volunteer Reserve (RNVR), known as the 'Wavy Navy' on account of the rank stripes (rings) on officers sleeves being wavy rather than straight. The RNVR was organised in 'Divisions' whose names were taken from the place where the main centre was situated. London, Edinburgh and most large seaports had such divisions. Each division was commanded by a Captain.

=== The Newfoundland Royal Naval Reserve ===
In 1902, the Admiralty Lords decided to establish a Royal Naval Reserve unit at St. John's, Newfoundland. HMS Calypso, a small older cruiser, was sent across the Atlantic to provide accommodation. 600 men, overwhelmingly local fishermen and seamen, were recruited. Many were seconded for training to the North Atlantic and West Indies Squadron. During the First World War the Newfoundland Royal Naval Reserve served with the regular navy and in 1916 the Calypso was renamed the H.M.S. Briton.

=== Decline ===
In the late 1930s, The Admiralty realised that the numbers available would not meet the needs of the fast approaching war and created the Royal Naval Volunteer Supplementary Reserve (RNVSR). The main recruits were amateur yachtsmen, who were given sufficient training to get them up to speed in a very high-pressure manner compared with the 'ordinary' RNVR. The RNVSR uniform was the same as the RNVR one. The RNVSR was dropped after World War II.

Those who became officers during World War II were considered to have joined the RNVR and wore that service's uniform. Most of the officers in landing craft, Coastal Forces and the Atlantic Convoys were RNVR and many regular officers were astonished how well they coped. A significant number achieved command of corvettes and even frigates. Quite a few also went into the submarine branch of the service and some achieved command there, the first being Commander E.P. Young DSO, DSC and bar, who commanded HMS Storm.

== See also ==
- Royal Naval Patrol Service
- Royal Australian Naval Reserve
- Royal Australian Naval Volunteer Reserve
