= Edward Preston Young =

English publisher and submariner (1913–2003)

Edward Young
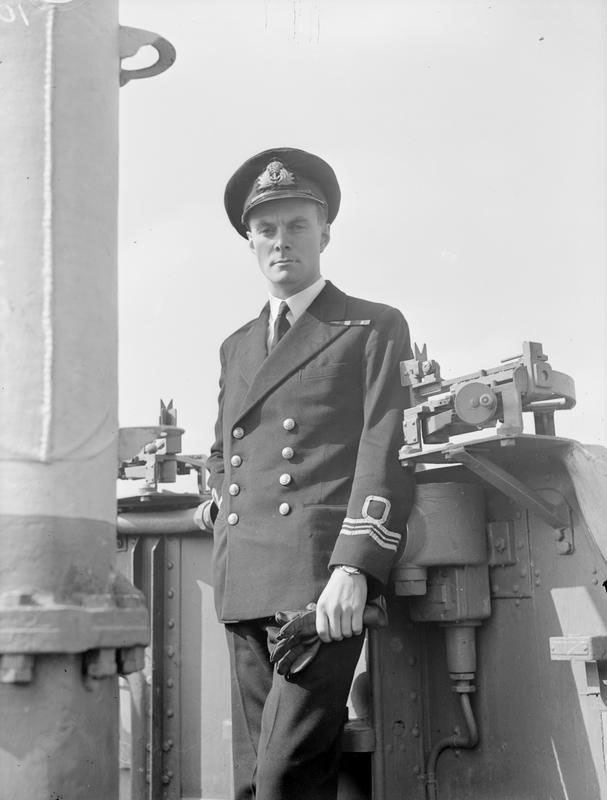
- Edward Young photographed on his return from the Pacific Ocean, April 1945
- Born: 17 November 1913; San Fernando, Trinidad
- Died: 28 January 2003 (aged 89); Littlehampton, Sussex
- Military career
- Allegiance: United Kingdom
- Branch: Royal Naval Volunteer Reserve
- Service years: 1940–1945
- Rank: Commander
- Nickname: Teddy
- Commands: HMS P555; HMS Storm
- Awards: Distinguished Service Order; Distinguished Service Cross & Bar; Mentioned in Despatches
- Other work: Graphic designer, author

Edward Preston "Teddy" Young, DSO, DSC & Bar (17 November 1913 – 28 January 2003), was a British graphic designer, submariner and publisher. In 1935, he joined the then new publishers Penguin Books and was responsible for designing the cover scheme used by Penguin for many years as well as drawing the original penguin logo. During World War II he served in the Royal Naval Volunteer Reserve (RNVR) and became the first British RNVR officer to command a submarine. After the war he returned to the publishing world and eventually became managing director of the Rainbird Group. Having written his wartime biography, One of Our Submarines, in 1952, he later wrote several other books.

== Early life ==
Young was born in San Fernando, Trinidad, but his family moved to London while he was a child. He was educated at Highgate School in London. At 18 he left school and joined publishers The Bodley Head, remaining with the firm until 1935 when he moved to join Penguin Books as production manager.

=== Penguin Books ===
Penguin Books was newly formed in 1935 by Allen Lane. Previously managing director at Bodley Head, it was Lane who invited Young to join his new company. One of the first jobs given to Young was to go to London Zoo to make sketches of penguins to be used as the symbol for Penguin Books. Reportedly he returned from this job with the comment "My God, how those birds stink!" but the logo he drew appeared on all Penguin books until 1949. Along with Lane, Young also devised the colour schemes used by the firm on book covers; orange/white/orange for novels, green for crime and detective novels, and pale blue for the Pelican series. The designs were commemorated in 2009 when the Royal Mail included Young's design in a series of stamps celebrating British design classics. Young left Penguin in 1939 to join The Reprint Society but left the society soon after with the outbreak of the war.

== War service ==
A keen yachtsman before the war, Young was appointed to the RNVR as a probationary sub-lieutenant on 12 April 1940 and underwent initial training at HMS King Alfred, the main RNVR shore establishment at Hove in Sussex. Volunteers were sought from suitable RNVR officers to join the submarine branch, Young volunteered with two others and after an interview and familiarisation trip on HMS Otway was accepted for service into submarines. Before reporting for submarine officer training at HMS Dolphin he was required to undertake a period of service on a surface ship, so Young joined HMS Atherstone on patrol in the North Sea. He was lucky in that both the commanding officer and First Lieutenant of Atherstone had served in submarines and were able to impart a lot of knowledge to Young.

In August 1940, Young reported to HMS Dolphin to find that he was the only one of the three RNVR volunteers to have progressed to training. Young therefore became the first executive branch officer of the RNVR to enter the submarine service. Young passed the course, top of the class, and was posted as a watchkeeping officer to HMS H28 based at Harwich. After several operational patrols in the North Sea, H28 became part of Seventh Submarine Flotilla, a training flotilla based at Rothesay on the west coast of Scotland.

=== HMS Umpire ===
On 23 March 1941, Young was posted to the submarine HMS Umpire, and was promoted to lieutenant on 12 April. Umpire was a new boat still undergoing commissioning trials on the River Medway. On commissioning, the boat was ordered to join Third Submarine Flotilla at Dunoon. Attached to a north bound convoy, Umpire developed an engine problem and fell slightly behind the convoy. In the dark night of 19/20 July 1941 the boat was not seen by Peter Hendriks, an armed trawler escorting a south bound convoy, and the two ships collided. Umpire sank almost immediately. Young was not on duty at the time and after the collision found himself in a flooding boat resting on the bottom of the North Sea in 80 feet (24.4 m) of water. Having tried to surface the boat using compressed air and having searched for other survivors, Young ended up in the conning tower with the First Lieutenant, an Engine Room Artificer (ERA) and an able seaman. They estimated that as a result of the angle of the boat and the height of the conning tower there was only about 45 feet (13.7 m) above them and that they should attempt to swim to the surface. Closing the hatch below them, they forced open the upper hatch and escaped. The ERA was never seen again and the First Lieutenant drowned after reaching the surface. Young and the seaman were picked up together with several men who had escaped through the engine room hatch. The Commanding Officer, Lt M Wingfield, had already been rescued, having been on the bridge when the collision occurred. All told 2 officers and 20 ratings died with only 2 officers, Young and Wingfield, and 14 ratings surviving. These figures appear in Young's account but the official record shows that there 16 lost and 17 survivors.

=== S-class boats ===
Following the sinking of Umpire Young was posted as Torpedo Officer to HMS Sealion, an S-class submarine. During his time on Sealion the boat operated in Arctic waters, being based for some time in Murmansk. On return from Russia, Young was made First Lieutenant of Sealion until she was docked for a refit.

Young was then transferred to HMS Saracen again as First Lieutenant. Saracen was a new boat and on her "working up" patrol in the North Sea, Saracen sank the German submarine U-335. For his part in this action Young was Mentioned in Despatches. In the Mediterranean Saracen was part of Tenth Submarine Flotilla based in Malta. She undertook a number of patrols and Young was awarded the Distinguished Service Cross (DSC) following the sinking of the Italian submarine Granito in December 1942.

=== First command ===
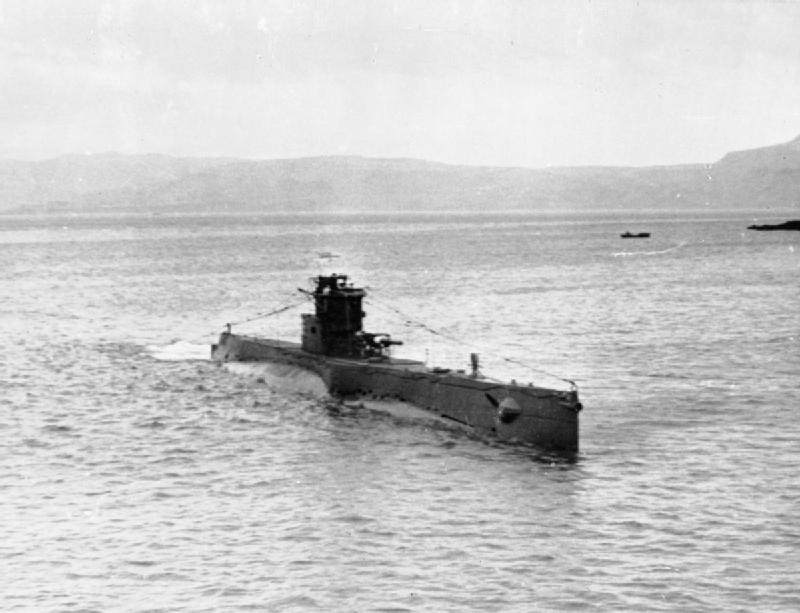
HMS/M P555. Young's first command

Returning to port on Christmas Day 1942, Young received a signal ordering him to return to the United Kingdom to attend the Commanding Officer's Qualifying Course (COQC). Arriving back in England in January 1943, Young passed the COQC (or perisher as it was commonly known) and was appointed commanding officer of HMS P555, an American S-class boat acquired by the Royal Navy in 1942. Young commanded the boat, known as State Express after the cigarette brand, for three months before being appointed as commander of a new boat, then under construction. On his appointment to P555, Young was the first British RNVR officer to command a submarine.

=== HMS Storm ===
The boat was HMS Storm then being built by Cammell Laird on the River Mersey. On commissioning Storm joined Third Submarine Flotilla and her first patrol was to northern Norway. This was to be the only patrol in European waters as Young and Storm sailed to the Pacific in late December 1943 to become part of Fourth Submarine Flotilla at Trincomalee, Ceylon (now Sri Lanka). Arriving in the Far East in February 1944, Storm carried out four patrols and one special mission from Sri Lanka. During the first two patrols they sank a Japanese navy minesweeper as well as several merchant ships. After two patrols Storm landed an agent on the Japanese held island of Pulau Weh in northwest Sumatra. Four days later, Storm returned to collect the agent, during which time the Japanese had prepared an ambush and Storm came under concerted gunfire as the two-man special forces team rowed ashore to meet the agent. Young held Storm as close as possible to the shore to allow the two men to return to the boat. Once retrieved Young dived the submarine and made for home. One member of the crew had been wounded during the exchange of gunfire.

By the end of March 1944, Young was promoted to acting lieutenant commander, this stopped a previous source of embarrassment to guests who did not know Young. Young, a Lieutenant RNVR, wore the wavy stripes of the RNVR, while his First Lieutenant, Brian Mills, was a regular Royal Navy Lieutenant and wore the straight stripes of regular officer. Many visitors to Storm did not know Young and made the assumption that Mills, as the regular officer, was the commanding officer of the submarine. During a final patrol from Trincomalee, Young took Storm into Port Owen on Tavoy Island and in a surface action sank several vessels. During another surface action on this patrol Storm became the first submarine to pick up a Japanese prisoner, when a soldier, who was a passenger on a freighter sunk by Storm, was picked up. For this series of patrols Young was awarded the Distinguished Service Order.

In September 1944, Storm was transferred to the Eighth Submarine Flotilla operating from Fremantle, Australia. Two further patrols were undertaken while based in Australia and on the second of them a short lived record was set for the longest patrol by an S-class boat, when the patrol lasted 37 days and covered 7,151 miles (11,508 km). After this patrol Storm and her crew were directed to return to the United Kingdom. Leaving Australia at the end of January, Storm reached England on 8 April 1945, during which Young suffered recollections of the Umpire sinking when Storm was almost rammed by a merchant ship in fog in the Bay of Biscay. Once home, Young parted company with Storm and was promoted to commander on 31 July 1945 with a staff appointment with Seventh Submarine Flotilla aboard HMS Cyclops becoming the only RNVR officer to hold such a post. In June, for the patrols from Fremantle a Bar to his DSC was awarded. Young left the navy in November 1945.

== Postwar career ==
On being de-mobilized Young briefly rejoined The Reprint Society and then moved to Pan Books before moving to Rupert Hart-Davis Ltd as production director. In 1952, Young wrote his autobiography entitled One of Our Submarines which was published by Rupert Hart-Davis Ltd. Two years later, Penguin Books honoured their former member of staff by making the paperback edition of One of Our Submarines the 1000th Penguin publication.

He wrote two further non-fiction works; Look at Lighthouses (1961), and Look at Submarines (1964), and one work of fiction, The Fifth Passenger (1962), before retirement in 1973, having ended his working career as managing director of the Rainbird Publishing Group.
