= Royal Navy cutlasses =

Swords in British military service 1804–1936

Royal Navy cutlass
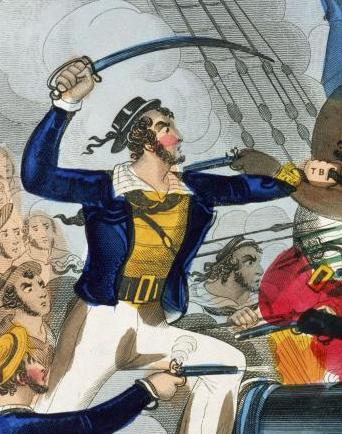
- A depiction of a Royal Navy rating with cutlass in a boarding action
- Type: Cutlass
- Place of origin: United Kingdom

Service history
- In service: 1804–1936 (combat); 1936–present (ceremonial)
- Used by: Royal Navy; HM Coastguard; Royal Naval Artillery Volunteers
- Wars: Napoleonic Wars; Battle of Abu Klea (cutlass bayonet); Boxer Rebellion (last recorded combat use, 1900)

Production history
- Designer: Board of Ordnance; George Lovell (1845 Pattern)
- Designed: 1804 (1804 Pattern); 1845 (1845 Pattern); 1889 (1889 Pattern); 1900 (1900 Pattern)
- Manufacturer: Over 30 known manufacturers, including Wilkinson Sword; blades also sourced from Birmingham, Enfield and Solingen
- Produced: 1804–c. 1900
- No. built: 10,000+ (initial 1804 order); 80,000+ (1859 Enfield Cutlass Bayonet)
- Variants: 1804 Pattern; 1845 Pattern; 1889 Pattern; 1900 Pattern; 1859 Enfield Cutlass Bayonet; 1871 Pattern Cutlass Bayonet; Coastguard Pattern

Specifications
- Blade length: 26–29.25 in (66.0–74.3 cm) (blade, varies by pattern)
- Width: 1.25–1.5 in (3.2–3.8 cm) (blade)
- Blade type: Single-edged; straight or curved depending on pattern; spear-pointed from 1889
- Hilt type: Double-disc (pre-1845); steel bowl guard (1845 onwards); cast iron or leather-covered grip
- Scabbard/sheath: Leather scabbard with brass or steel chape (brown pre-1889, black thereafter)

Ratings of the Royal Navy have used cutlasses, short, wide bladed swords, since the early 18th century. These were originally of non-uniform design but the 1804 Pattern, the first Navy-issue standard cutlass, was introduced at the start of the 19th century. This was a bluntish weapon that was perhaps intended for cutting away canvas and ropes rather than as a thrusting combat weapon. The 1845 Pattern cutlass introduced a bowl-style hand guard which provided greater protection, with a longer and more curved blade. Its sharper point made it more useful for thrusting attacks, which were now emphasised in the drill manual. The 1845 Pattern was modified several times including shortening and straightening the blades, which weakened them. The 1889 Pattern had a straight, spear-pointed blade with a hilt that curved outwards to catch and redirect an opponent's sword point. The 1900 Pattern, the last navy-issue cutlass, was similar to its predecessor with the introduction of a fuller and a hilt insert that cushioned the user's little finger. The cutlass was withdrawn from service in 1936 but remains in use for ceremonial purposes. It is thought that it was last used in combat in 1900 during the Boxer Rebellion.

In addition to the cutlass the Royal Navy designed and issued cutlass-style bayonets for some of its mid-19th-century rifles. The first of these was introduced in 1859 for the Pattern 1853 Enfield. This was the first rifle to be issued to the navy, who had previously used muskets with standard British Army issue bayonets. The 1859 Enfield Cutlass Bayonet could be used either as a handheld weapon or mounted to the rifle. It proved less than ideal in both roles, its hilt not providing sufficient protection for the hand and its weight unbalancing the rifle. The 1859 Pattern bayonet remained in use when the rifle was converted to the Snider–Enfield. The introduction of the Martini-Henry rifle saw a new 1871 Pattern cutlass bayonet introduced. Though some new weapons were manufactured, many were made by cutting down the 1859 Pattern which weakened the blades. When the navy adopted the Lee–Metford rifle in 1888 it did not design its own cutlass bayonet and used the standard army-issue pattern.

== Background ==
The cutlass is a short sword with a wide single-edged blade that is often curved. In the Royal Navy it was a sword purchased by the government and issued to ratings, the enlisted men. Officers carried privately purchased long swords and midshipmen dirks. Seaborne soldiers of the Royal Marines were not issued cutlasses and instead carried bayonets for their longarms. When carrying out a boarding action the first wave of sailors would often be issued a cutlass and pistol for offensive action while the second wave were armed with more defensive weapons such as the boarding pike.

The cutlass may have had its origins in the hanger, a short curved sword that was used by the Royal Navy in the 17th century. The term "cutlass" was never used by the navy as the designation for an individual weapon pattern; the official terms used were "Sword for Sea Service" or "Sword, Naval". However, the weapon was commonly referred to as such in unofficial and official situations, for example the navy drill manual describes "cutlass" exercises.

== Early cutlasses ==
From the beginning of the 18th century the cutlass began to be adopted as the melee weapon for naval ratings. The Board of Ordnance placed orders for quantities of the weapons but these do not seem to have been from a set pattern with different manufacturers providing their own styles of sword.

Surviving weapons from this period have blades measuring 25–28.5 inches (64–72 cm) in length with a fuller groove on the back edge. The hilts are sometimes brass and sometimes steel. Brass was more corrosion resistant and cheaper than steel but heavier and more easily damaged. Many surviving brass hilts show evidence of damage to the knuckle guard or quillon (cross guard at the back of the grip). By the middle of the century advances in steel-making, such as the use of drop forging, had reduced the cost of the material and the Royal Navy adopted the steel hilt. In naval service the hilt was often painted black for corrosion protection.

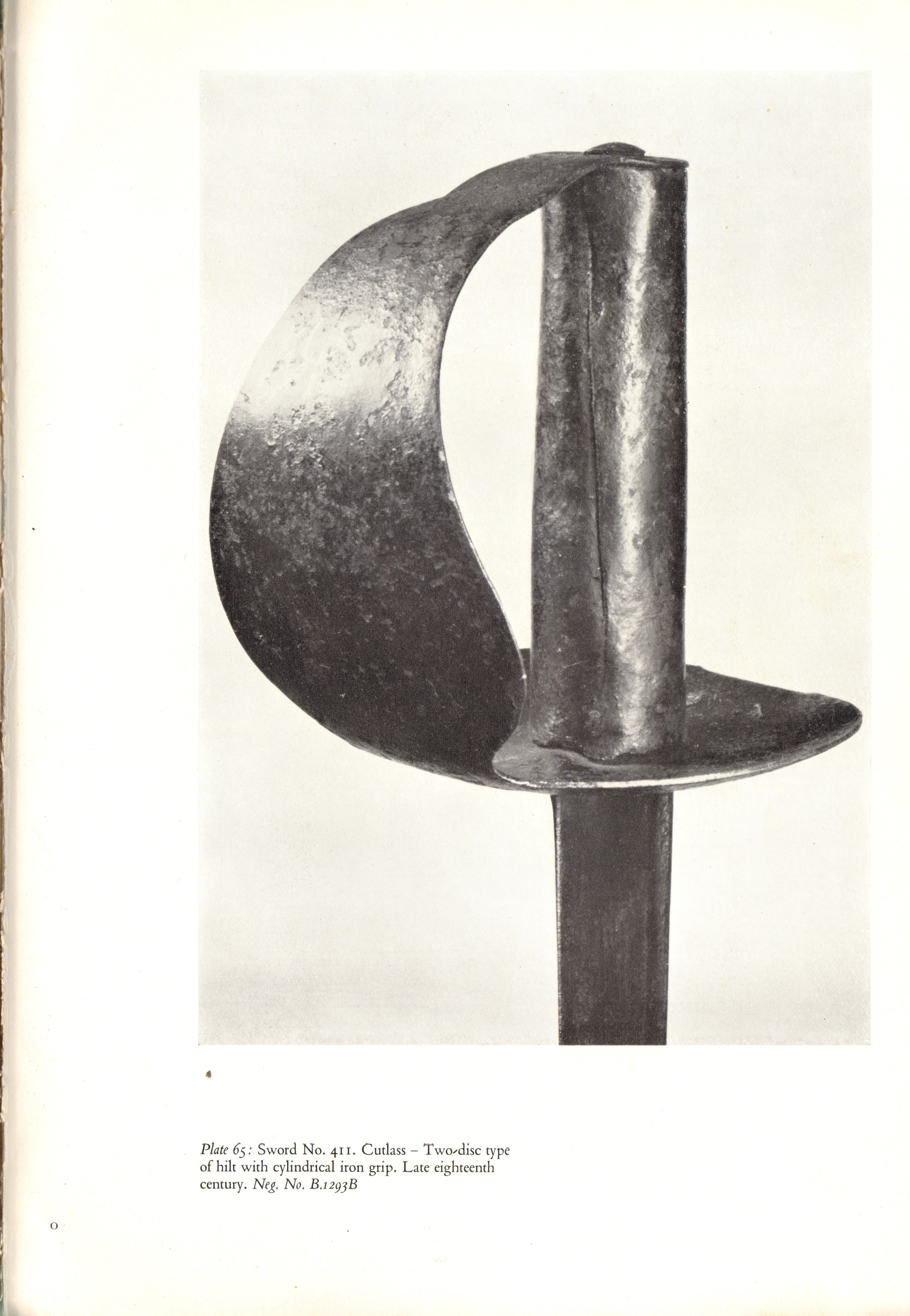
Late 18th-century cutlass with double-disc hand-guard and tubular grip. From May & Annis (1970).

From around the middle of the century the Board of Ordnance favoured the "double disc" or "figure of eight" cutlass hilt. This most likely originated with weapons supplied by Thomas Hollier of Whitechapel who sold 1,000 cutlasses to the board in 1726. The hilt featured a circle of metal above the hand as a crossguard and another circle as a knuckle guard. Although antler had earlier been favoured as a material for the grip the board switched to a plain tubular-shaped steel grip, which was cheaper but also slippery in wet conditions.

== Navy pattern cutlasses ==
=== 1804 Pattern ===
The Board of Ordnance established its first standard pattern of cutlass in 1804, placing an order for 10,000 "Swords for Sea Service" on 30 May. By this time ships-of-the-line were carrying hundreds of cutlasses each. The blade of the 1804 Pattern cutlass was almost straight and had no fuller. It measured 27 7/8–29 1/4 inches (71–74 cm) in length and 1 1/4–1 1/2 inches (3.2–3.8 cm) in width. Many surviving examples have a bluntish point which, with the blade's flat profile giving it poor stiffness, made it a poor thrusting weapon. This was either due to cost limitations or as the weapon was intended to be used for cutting with the edge. One intended use might have been for cutting away canvas and ropes, for which the heavy weight of the blade was advantageous.

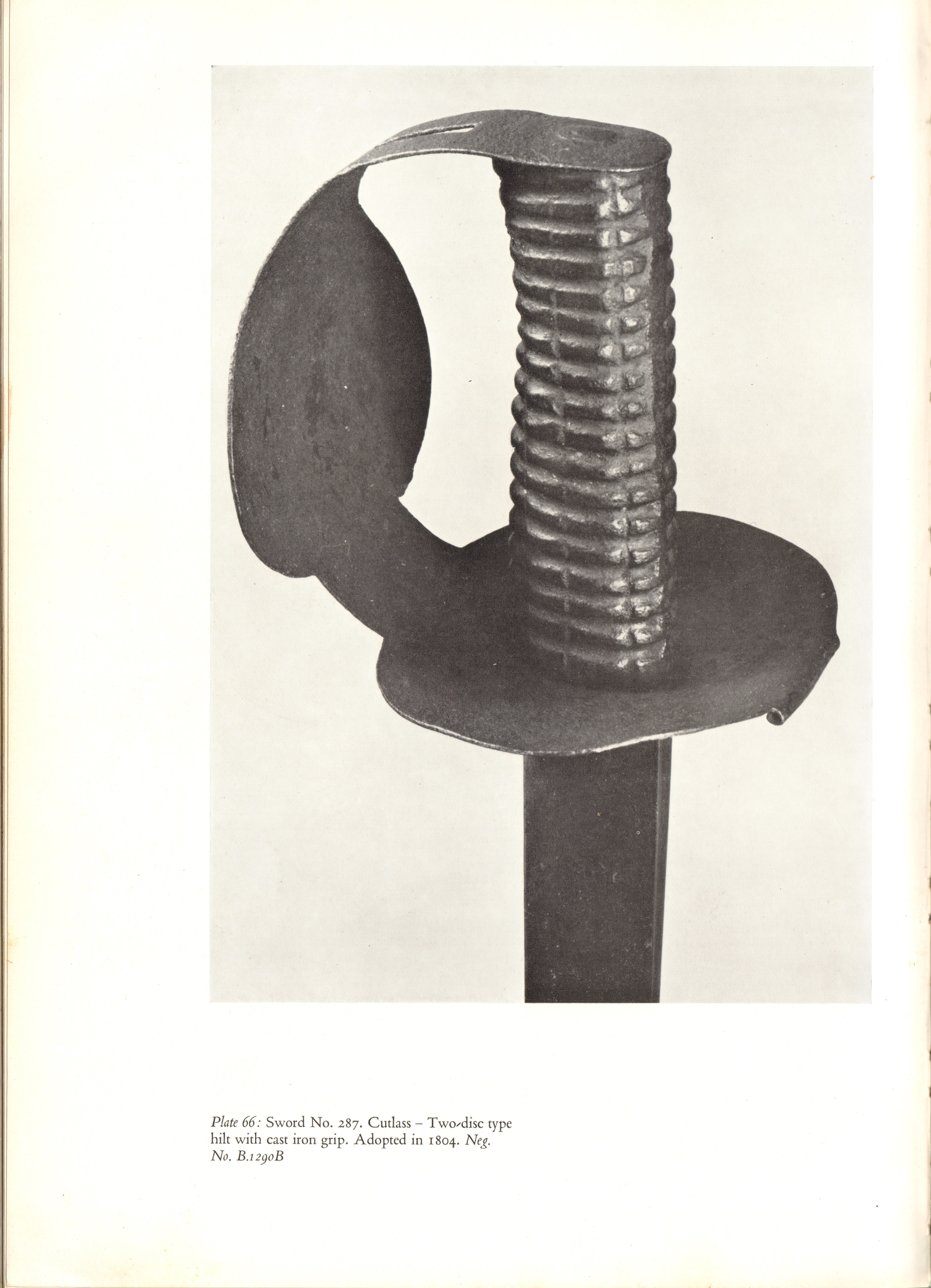
Royal Navy Cutlass of 1804 showing double-disc hand-guard. From May & Annis (1970)

The 1804 Pattern cutlass had a double disc guard though, unlike earlier cutlasses, the quillon was a relatively small roll of steel. The smooth tubular grip was replaced by one of cast iron, shaped to fit the hand and with grooves (usually 18 circumferential and six longitudinal) to improve grip. Like many of the 18th-century cutlasses there was no pommel where the guard met the grip. A slot in the guard allowed for the use of a sword knot, possibly because the Board of Ordnance was more familiar with British Army swords, which it also supplied, on which these features were provided. The navy does not appear to have issued sword knots as standard but there is some contemporary evidence that the slot was used with rope to attach the sword to the user's wrist.

The cutlass was provided with a brown leather scabbard, with a brass chape. The scabbard had no locket around the top and was connected to the user's belt by means of a frog hook straight through the leather. This was a relatively weak fixing and few hooks remain on surviving scabbards. Aside from government markings the 1804 Pattern cutlass is similar to, and sometimes confused with, early American cutlasses and the 1814 Pattern Norwegian cutlass.

=== 1845 Pattern ===
After the end of the Napoleonic Wars in 1815 the Royal Navy reduced in size from 145,000 men to 19,000. Despite this drop in the requirement for new cutlasses the Board of Ordnance held trials of six new designs in 1841. In the following year The Admiralty accepted the design proposed by George Lovell, the inspector of small arms. The 1845 Pattern cutlass appears to have been based on Lovell's designs. It is possible that this pattern entered service earlier than 1845 but a fire at the Tower of London storehouse has clouded the issue. 1845 is the first year that saw significant quantities of the cutlass issued.

The 1845 Pattern was significantly different from the 1804 Pattern. The blade, at 29 1/2 inches (75 cm), was the longest of any pattern of cutlass to be issued and was significantly more curved. The knuckle-guard was a simple steel bowl, providing greater protection than the double disc design, the outside of which curved outwards for additional strength (a feature retained in later patterns). The hilt had no quillon but retained the slit for a sword knot. It is possible that the guard was modelled on that of the 1821 Pattern Heavy Cavalry Sword, though this retained the quillon and lacked the outwards curve.

The 1845 Pattern retained the cast-iron grip but it was simplified with no longitudinal grooves and only 12 circumferential grooves. The grip was also less ergonomically shaped than the 1804 Pattern, possibly for cost reasons. The 1845 Pattern also introduced a small pommel at the base of the hilt, which was referred to as a burr. The scabbard was similar to the 1804 Pattern, with the same lack of locket which again often allowed the frog hook to pull out from the leather. The 1845 Pattern featured an acute point, making it more useful than its predecessor for thrusting which was now emphasised in the navy's drill manuals.

==== Modifications ====
The 1845 Pattern was subject to many minor modifications, though the official records of these have been lost. These would have come within the remit of the War Department (and its successor the War Office), which took over responsibility for the procurement of naval weapons, including cutlasses, in 1854, shortly before the Board of Ordnance was disbanded.

A modification introduced around 1859 reduced the distance between the grip and inside face of the knuckle guard from 2 3/4 inches (7.0 cm) to 2 3/8 inches (6.0 cm), narrowed the width of the guard where it met the pommel and inserted a washer between the guard and the grip. The top edge of the guard was also turned out slightly, towards the blade. At the same time the blade was shortened to 27 inches (69 cm) and reduced slightly in width.

In the 1870s the blades were again shortened, this time to 26 inches (66 cm). The same decade a second round of modifications straightened the blades. The straightened blades were not initially re-heat treated, which left them weaker and liable to bend. Following complaints some were re-treated, these being marked with an "R". In 1887 the blades were shortened further.

=== 1889 Pattern ===
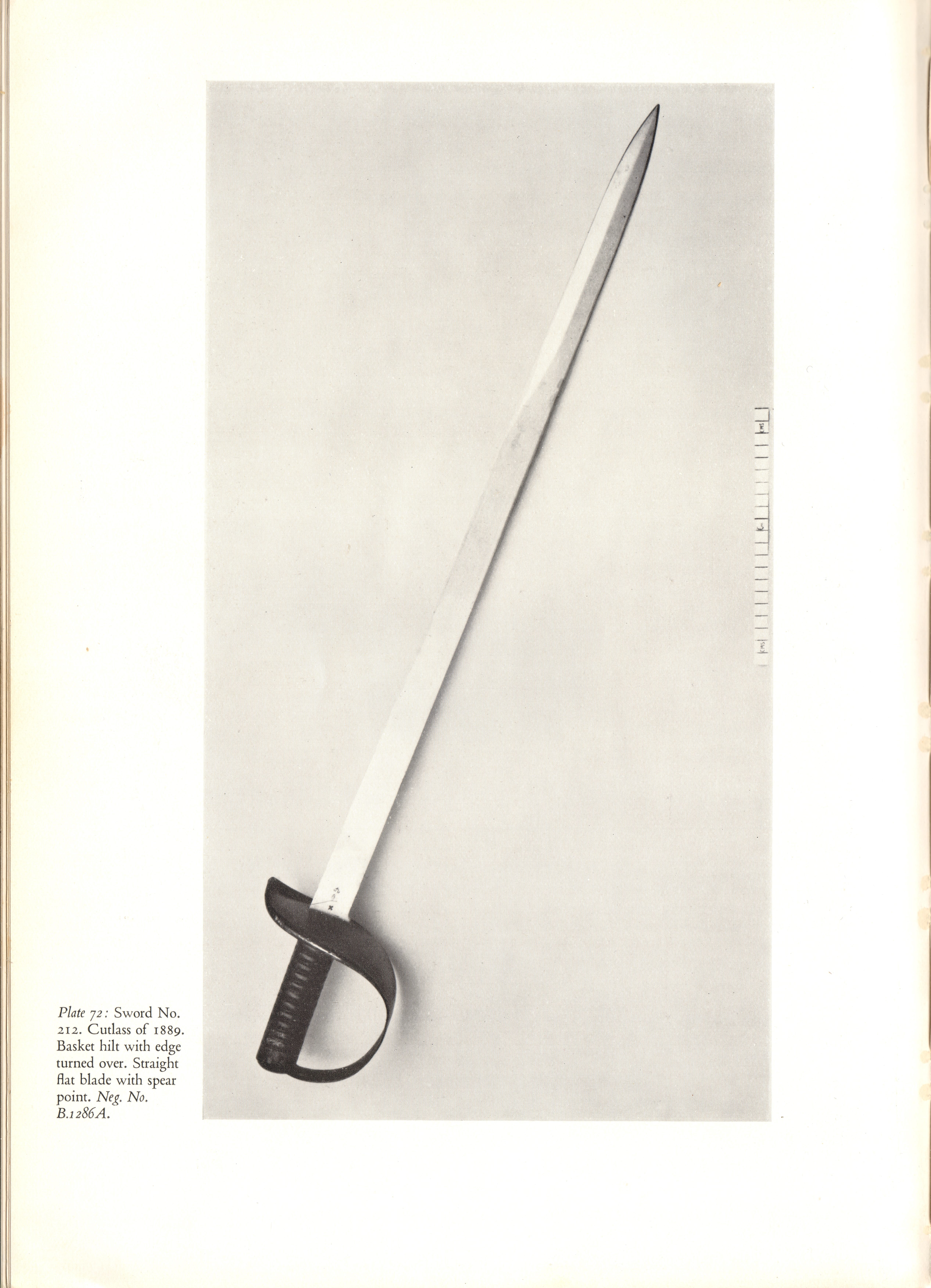
The 1889 Cutlass, from May & Annis (1970)

Sailors on HMS Niobe practise cutlass drill during the Second Boer War, 1900

Perhaps because stocks of the 1845 Pattern cutlass were running low, preventing further modification, a new pattern was introduced in 1889. The 1889 Pattern cutlass was straight, with a spear point. The bowl-hilt of the weapon was modelled on the 1882 Pattern Cavalry Sword. The grip was formed of cast iron and almost cylindrical. The 1889 Pattern included perhaps the most innovative feature of any Royal Navy cutlass. The edge of the guard was rolled outwards, adding strength to the guard and also acting as a stop rib which could catch an opponent's sword point and deflect it away from the user. A mix of bright steel and black-painted sword guards seem to have been used. It is likely that ceremonial weapons were kept in bright steel and service weapons were painted, either before being issued or on an ad hoc basis on ships. The scabbard of the 1889 Pattern cutlass was in black leather with two steel mounts and, for the first time in a Royal Navy pattern, featured a locket.

=== 1900 Pattern ===
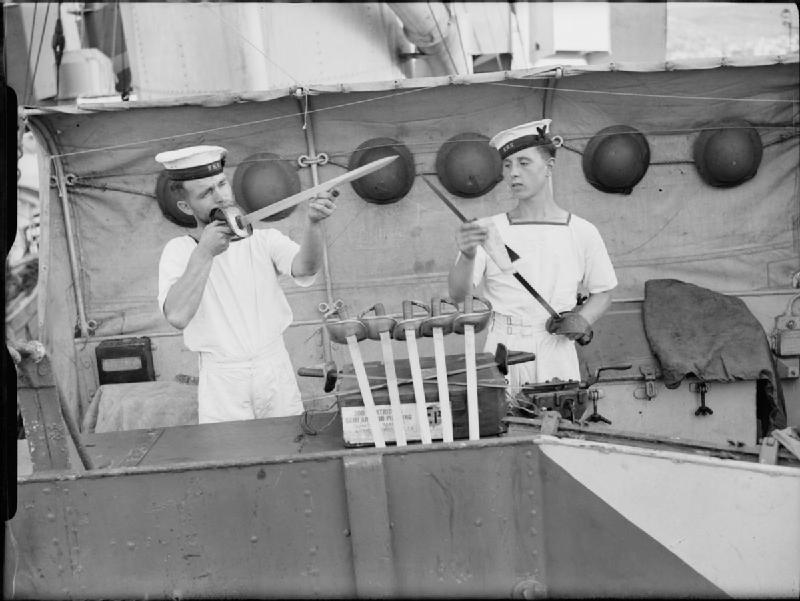
Sailors clean 1900 Pattern cutlasses aboard HMS Hero during the Second World War

The final cutlass approved for naval use was the 1900 Pattern. This retained the straight blade of the 1889 Pattern, but introduced a fuller running one-third of the blade length. The bowl-type hilt with upturned rim was also retained, though a concave insert was added to the inside where the guard joins the pommel. This helped to cushion the user's little finger and was derived from the 1890 Pattern Cavalry Sword. As with the 1889 Pattern grips survive in both bright steel and black paint. The grip of the 1900 Pattern cutlass was more rectangular in section than its predecessor and had a knurled leather cover. The scabbard was identical to that used for the 1889 Pattern.

In 1903, the Royal Navy received a quantity of British Army pioneer swords as they were withdrawn from use, though there is little evidence that these were ever issued to ratings. The 1900 Pattern cutlass was withdrawn from combat service on 22 October 1936. The order noted that the cutlass was no longer to be issued for use by landing parties but was to be retained for ceremonial use, with numbers being limited to 20 for each ship with more than 500 personnel and 10 for ships with fewer personnel. There are claims that the cutlass was used in combat during the 1940 Altmark incident and that it was issued to a boarding party aboard HMS Armada in 1952, but Barton and McGrath (2013) doubt the veracity of these. They maintain that the cutlass last saw combat service in 1900 during the Boxer Rebellion.

Until the mid-2010s, a drawn cutlass was carried by the prisoner's escort at Royal Navy courts martial. The cutlass is now carried only by warrant officers first class, masters-at-arms and chief petty officers when escorting the White Ensign.

== Navy pattern cutlass bayonets ==
=== 1859 Enfield Cutlass Sword Bayonet ===
The Royal Navy was issued with its first rifled long arm in 1859, the .577 calibre Pattern 1853 Enfield. Navy muskets had previously been fitted with the standard army issue bayonet but for this weapon the navy decided to have its own unique bayonet, that could also be used as a hand-held cutlass. A bayonet based on the 1845 Pattern cutlass was developed. This had a spear-pointed flat blade profile, measuring 27 inches (69 cm) in length and slightly curved. The hilt had a steel guard of 4 1/2 inches (11 cm) width, tapering to 5/8 inch (1.6 cm) where it met the pommel. The guard contained a slot for attachment of a sword knot and, like the modified 1845 Pattern cutlass, turned outwards slightly for strength. The grip was wood, covered in leather with six circumferential grooves. A quillon was included which included a ring, of 13/16 inch (2.1 cm) internal diameter, through which the muzzle of the Enfield was placed when fitted to that weapon. A mortice groove on the left side of the bayonet helped fit it to the rifle and it was secured by a leaf spring catch near the pommel. The bayonet weighed 2 pounds 5 ounces (1.0 kg) and when fitted to the rifle allowed the user to strike a target 7 feet (2.1 m) away.

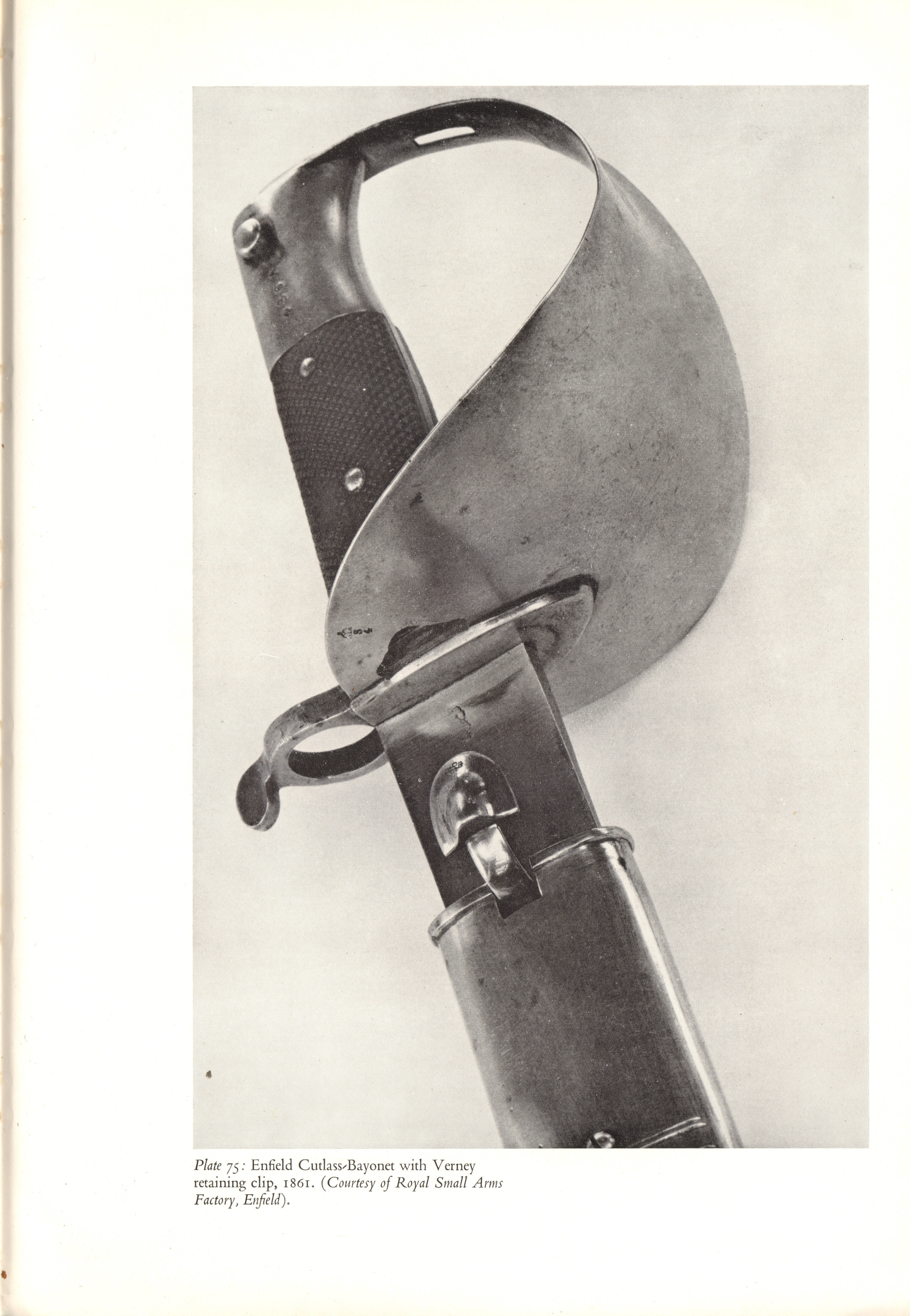
Enfield Cutlass-Bayonet with Verney retaining clip, 1861. From May & Annis (1970)

The design had been finalised on 18 April 1859 but was amended on 1 May to replace the grip with a knurled leather design, presumably as the original design had proven too slippery. The scabbard was of black leather with a steel locket and chape. The scabbard was fitted with "Verney's catch" to retain the bayonet when scrambling into and out of ship's boats. From 30 January 1862 the scabbards were redesigned by Colonel Dixon of the Royal Small Arm Factory to include a spring in lieu of Verney's catch, to retain the bayonet during such movements. The cutlass bayonet proved less than ideal in its role as a cutlass and as a bayonet. When wielded in the hand the muzzle ring quillon gave less protection to the hand than was desirable and when fitted to the rifle its weight made the weapon muzzle-heavy, affecting the sailor's aim. More than 80,000 1859 Enfield Cutlass Sword Bayonets were made and the weapon remained in use when the Enfields were converted into Snider–Enfield breechloading rifles from 1866.

=== 1871 Martini-Henry Cutlass Sword Bayonet ===
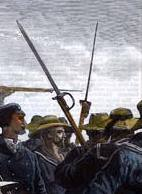
Martini-Henry cutlass bayonets at the 1879 Battle of Gingindlovu

The .450 calibre Martini-Henry rifle was trialled from 1869 as a replacement for the Snider–Enfield and subsequently adopted by the War Department. The War Department decided to continue to issue a separate cutlass bayonet for the Royal Navy. Initially it was hoped that the 1859 Pattern could be modified to suit the Martini-Henry by fitting a bush to reduce the muzzle ring diameter to suit the new weapon's small barrel diameter. However the heavy weight of the 1859 cutlass bayonet was found to unbalance the Martini-Henry too much.

Following trials from November 1869 into 1870, a new cutlass bayonet was developed, known as the 1871 Pattern. The new weapon was shorter, at 25 1/2 inches (65 cm), and narrower, at 1 1/4 inches (3.2 cm) wide, and therefore lighter, weighing 1 pound 15 ounces (0.88 kg). The blade was straight, unlike its predecessor. The scabbard, as before, was black leather with a steel chape and locket.

Some 1871 Pattern bayonets were manufactured but many seem to have been made by converting 1859 Pattern weapons. The process of conversion included shortening and straightening the blade and reducing the size of the hilt. Between 1874 and 1880 some 50,711 1859 Pattern cutlasses were converted to the 1871 Pattern at a cost of between 8 and 9 shillings a piece (equivalent to £2 in 2025). The straightened weapons were not re-heat treated and suffered a loss of strength. There were complaints about the bayonets bending during drill exercises and at the 1885 Battle of Abu Klea a sailor was killed after his bayonet bent and was trapped in the body of his enemy. In 1887 a series of tests found 60% of the converted bayonets failed a strength test.

In 1888, the Royal Navy adopted the Lee–Metford rifle and opted not to procure a cutlass bayonet, instead using the standard bayonet as used by the British Army.

== Markings ==
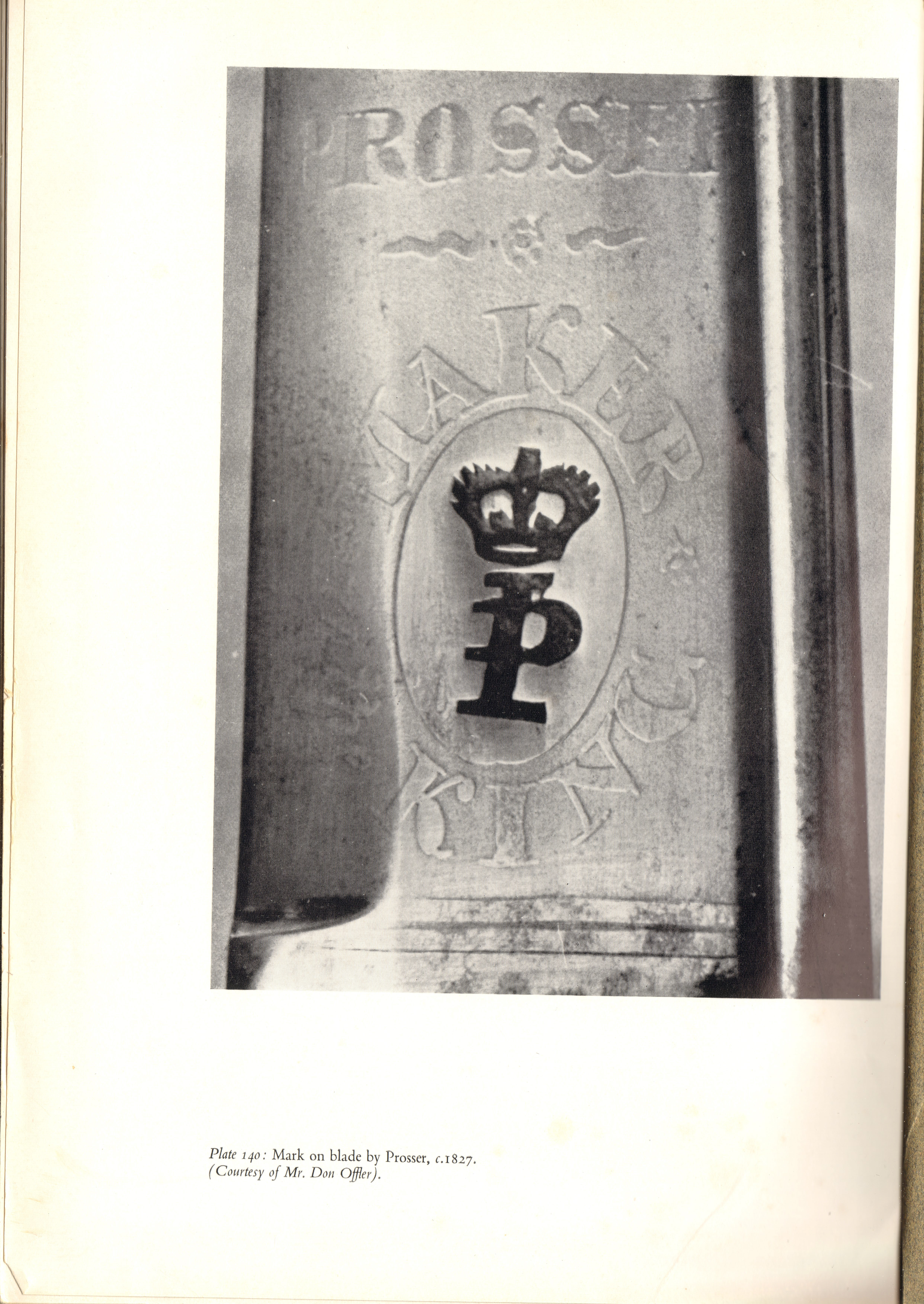
Mark on blade by Prosser, c.1827. From May & Annis (1970)

Swords are often marked with details of their manufacturer and service use, for Royal Navy cutlasses the markings vary over time. The only marking on pre-1804 cutlasses is usually that of the manufacturer. From 1804 official pattern cutlasses are marked with the royal cypher of the monarch at the time and sometimes an inspection mark consisting of a crown and identifying numeral. From 1804 the maker's mark is usually found on the back edge of the blade, at least 30 different manufacturers of Royal Navy cutlasses are known from 1804 or later. The cyphers were later replaced by a crown with a letter identifying an inspection location and a number identifying the individual government inspector. The letters were initially "B" for Birmingham and "E" for Enfield, with an "S" for Solingen (in modern Germany) added when issues with supply led the government to seek blades from abroad and a "W" for Wilkinson Sword when that company was permitted to carry out testing on behalf of the government.

The broad arrow

Where pre-1854 cutlasses were marked as owned by the government this was a "BO" for the Board of Ordnance; after this "WD" or the broad arrow of the War Department were used. When weapons were sold from service the mark was sometimes cancelled or, in the case, of the broad arrow a second arrow marked, point to point with the first. An "N" for navy is sometimes marked. From the late 19th century cutlasses were often stamped with the last two digits of the year of manufacture. Where weapons were converted they were stamped "C/XX" with the latter two digits indicating the year of conversion, a second inspection mark was also often added. The letter "R" indicated a weapon that was retempered after modification, the letter "X" indicates the side made convex during a compression test. The cutlasses were sometimes marked with a number to indicate their position in a weapons rack, for example of the quarterdeck of a ship. The Enfield cutlass bayonets were not generally interchangeable and so were numbered to match to a specific rifle. The scabbards are also sometimes marked, particularly for later units, with location of manufacture, "N" for navy and inspection stamp.

== Other cutlasses ==
HM Coastguard came under Admiralty control in 1856 and sometimes functioned like an auxiliary navy service before it was returned to civilian control in 1923. Since shortly after its 1822 formation ratings in the Coastguard were issued with a Coastguard Pattern cutlass. The blade of this weapon measured 29 3/4 inches (76 cm) in length and 1 7/16 inches (3.7 cm) in width, and had a pronounced curve. The guard was stirrup shaped, with a pronounced quillon and no pommel. The grip was shaped to suit the hand and had 19 spiral grooves. The scabbard was brown leather with a brass chape and frog hook. Soon after the Admiralty took over the Coastguard cutlass was withdrawn and standard navy pattern weapons issued. The hilts of the Coastguard cutlasses were reused by the War Department; mounted to straight blades they were issued to privates of the Army Hospital Corps from 1857.

The Royal Naval Artillery Volunteers, a naval reserve force from 1873 to 1892, also had their own cutlass pattern. This was a hybrid design between the naval cutlass and a navy officer's sword; it is not known if this weapon was issued to ratings, warrant officers or officers. Another maritime force, the Thames River Police, which was brought into government control in 1800 was also issued with its own cutlass before its merger with the Metropolitan Police in 1839. The Revenue Service, precursor of HM Coastguard, may also have been issued with their own cutlass design.

== Bibliography ==
- Barton, Mark; McGrath, John (3 July 2013). British Naval Swords and Swordsmanship. Seaforth Publishing. ISBN 978-1-84832-135-9.
- Carter, John. "The British Naval Cutlass Bayonet" (PDF). New Zealand Arms Register. New Zealand Society of Gunsmiths.
- Ford, Matthew (2013). "Towards a Revolution in Firepower? Logistics, Lethality, and the Lee-Metford". War in History. 20 (3): 273–299. doi:10.1177/0968344513483230. ISSN 0968-3445. JSTOR 26098505. S2CID 144919154.
- Manning, Stephen (30 September 2020). Bayonet to Barrage: Weaponry on the Victorian Battlefield. Pen and Sword Military. ISBN 978-1-5267-7724-9.
- May, W.E.; Annis, P.G.W (1970). Swords for Sea Service. H.M. Stationery Office. ISBN 0-11-290026-7. Volume 1; Volume 2.
