= HMS H28 =

Submarine of the Royal Navy

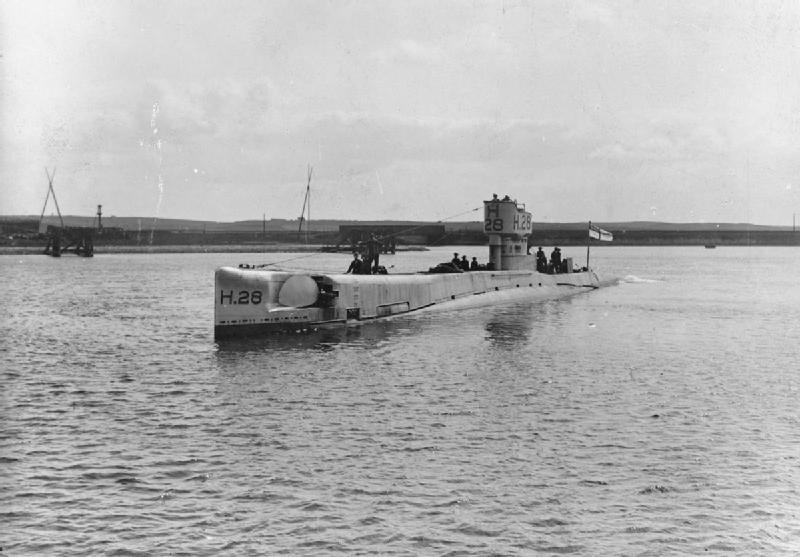

History

United Kingdom
- Name: H28
- Builder: Vickers Limited, Barrow-in-Furness
- Laid down: 18 March 1917
- Launched: 12 March 1918
- Commissioned: 29 June 1918
- Fate: Scrapped, 18 August 1944

General characteristics
- Class & type: H-class submarine
- Displacement: 423 long tons (430 t) surfaced; 510 long tons (518 t) submerged
- Length: 171 ft 0 in (52.12 m)
- Beam: 15 ft 4 in (4.67 m)
- Propulsion: 1 × 480 hp (358 kW) diesel engine; 2 × 620 hp (462 kW) electric motors
- Speed: 11.5 knots (21.3 km/h; 13.2 mph) surfaced; 9 knots (17 km/h; 10 mph) submerged
- Range: 2,985 nmi (5,528 km) at 7.5 kn (13.9 km/h; 8.6 mph) surfaced; 130 nmi (240 km) at 2 kn (3.7 km/h; 2.3 mph) submerged
- Complement: 22
- Armament: 4 × 21 in (533 mm) bow torpedo tubes; 8 × 21-inch torpedoes

HMS H28 was a British H-class submarine built by Vickers Limited, Barrow-in-Furness, as part of the Batch 3 H-class submarines. She was laid down on 18 March 1917 and was commissioned on 29 June 1918. H28 was the only British submarine to see active service in both World Wars, and was finally scrapped in 1944.

== Design ==
Like all post-H20 British H-class submarines, H28 had a displacement of 423 long tons (430 t) at the surface and 510 long tons (520 t) while submerged. It had a total length of 171 feet (52 m), a beam of 15 feet 4 inches (4.67 m), and a draught of 39 feet 4 inches (12 m). It contained diesel engines providing a total power of 480 horsepower (360 kW) and two electric motors each providing 320 horsepower (240 kW). The use of its electric motors made the submarine travel at 11 knots (20 km/h; 13 mph). It would normally carry 16.4 long tons (16.7 t) of fuel and had a maximum capacity of 18 long tons (18 t).

The submarine had a maximum surface speed of 13 knots (24 km/h; 15 mph) and a submerged speed of 10.5 knots (19.4 km/h; 12.1 mph). Post-H20 British H-class submarines had ranges of 2,985 nautical miles (5,528 km; 3,435 mi) at speeds of 7.5 knots (13.9 km/h; 8.6 mph) when surfaced. H28 was fitted with an anti-aircraft gun and four 21-inch (533 mm) torpedo tubes. Its torpedo tubes were fitted to the bow and the submarine was loaded with eight 21-inch torpedoes. It is a Holland 602 type submarine but was designed to meet Royal Navy specifications. Its complement was twenty-two crew members.

== Service ==
Following her commissioning, H28 saw active service in the final months of the First World War with the 8th Submarine Flotilla, based at Great Yarmouth. In 1919, she joined the 3rd Submarine Flotilla based at Portsmouth, however, the flotilla deployed to the Baltic Sea in September 1919 under Captain Max Horton as part of the Allied intervention in the Russian Civil War, where they remained until the sea froze over, returning to Britain on 2 January 1920. The flotilla relocated to Devonport in 1922. In 1927, H28 transferred to the 5th Submarine Flotilla at Gosport, where she was listed as being in reserve the following year, active in 1933 and in reserve again in 1938. During one of her periods of active service, during a visit by her flotilla to Ghent, H28 collided with the British steamer Vale of Mowbray in the Ghent–Terneuzen Canal on 28 May 1929. Both ships sustained minor damage, with H28 damaged above the waterline.

H28 was reactivated at the start of the Second World War, making her the only British submarine to see front line service in both conflicts. In 1939, she was still listed with the 5th Submarine Flotilla in the training role at Gosport, but following a refit at Sheerness, joined other H-class submarines at Harwich in September 1940. Joining H28 at this time was Sub-Lieutenant Edward Preston Young, who was the first Royal Naval Volunteer Reserve (RNVR) officer ever to be admitted to the Submarine Service. Following the fall of France in June 1940, these training submarines undertook operational patrols in the North Sea as an anti-invasion precaution. On 11 October 1940, H28 commanded by Lieutenant E A Woodward, unsuccessfully fired four torpedoes at a small enemy merchant ship off the Netherlands coast, and subsequently escaped after being depth-charged by escort vessels. Following the loss of H49 shortly afterwards, operational patrols by the other H-class submarines were suspended, and the flotilla moved to Rothesay on the River Clyde in December 1940 to resume training duties. These included giving new officers and ratings seagoing experience, as well as providing live targets for escort vessels practicing anti-submarine techniques.

On 18 August 1944 H28 was sold for demolition, and then broken up at Troon, Scotland.

== See also ==
- List of submarines of the Second World War

== Bibliography ==
- Hezlet, Arthur Richard (2001). British and allied submarine operations in World War II. Gosport: Royal Navy Submarine Museum. ISBN 978-0952669616.
- Hutchinson, Robert (2001). Jane's Submarines: War Beneath the Waves. London: HarperCollins. p. 49. ISBN 0-00710558-4.
- McCartney, Innes (2006). British Submarines 1939–45. Oxford: Osprey Publishing. ISBN 978-1846030079.
- Wright, Damien (2017). Churchill's Secret War with Lenin: British And Commonwealth Military Intervention In The Russian Civil War, 1918-20. Warwick: Helion and Company. ISBN 978-1911512103.
- Young, Edward (1997). One of Our Submarines. Ware, Hertfordshire: Wordsworth Editions. ISBN 978-1853266812.
