= HMS Fisgard (shore establishment) =

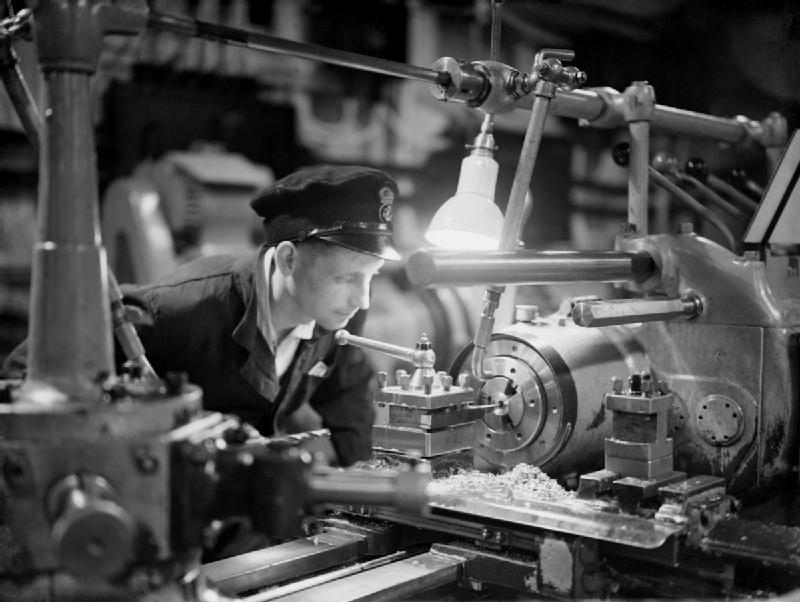
- An engine room artificer at work during the Second World War.

History

United Kingdom
- Name: HMS Fisgard
- In service: 1848 - 1872; 1904 - 1983
- Fate: Operational elements merged with HMS Raleigh

General characteristics
- Class & type: Stone frigate

HMS Fisgard was a shore establishment of the Royal Navy active at different periods and locations between 1848 and 1983. She was used to train artificers and engineers for the Navy.

== History ==
=== First Fisgard ===
HMS Fisgard was a 46-gun fifth rate Leda class frigate. She had been a depot ship and harbour flagship for Woolwich since 1848, and was used to train engineers and support those working onshore. Between 1853 and 1873 she served as the Headquarters ship of the Royal Naval Coast Volunteers. The facility closed in 1872 and Fisgard herself was broken up in 1879.

=== Fisgard revived ===
The idea for a specialised department to train engineers for an increasingly mechanised and professionalised navy came from the First Sea Lord Admiral Sir John Fisher. By early 1903 he had become concerned that the Imperial German Navy represented a threat to the interests of the Royal Navy, which might be in danger of being overtaken in seagoing technical expertise. He initiated a programme whereby engineers and artificers could be trained for service in the navy, and within two years the navy had established training centres in the major naval bases of Chatham, Plymouth Dockyard and Portsmouth. The Portsmouth base was established in a number of Victorian hulks, initially the old battleship HMS Audacious. This centre was named HMS Fisgard in 1904, in recognition of the previous engineer training establishment at Woolwich. Audacious was joined by HMS Invincible, named HMS Fisgard II in 1906, HMS Hindustan, named HMS Fisgard III in 1905 and HMS Sultan, named HMS Fisgard IV in 1906. The hulks were commissioned on 1 January 1906 under the joint name of HMS Fisgard.

Audacious left the establishment in 1914 to serve as a repair workshop at Scapa Flow, having been named Imperieuse. Invincible also left in 1914 for the same purpose but sank en route whilst under tow. Audacious was replaced as Fisgard by HMS Spartiate which took the name on 17 July 1915. Invincible was replaced as Fisgard II by HMS Hercules which also took the name on 17 July 1915. They were joined in 1919 by HMS Terrible, and when Hindostan left in 1920 Terrible became Fisgard III in her place.

=== Move to Chatham and the Second World War ===
The experiment proved a success and by the early 1920s the training of Artificer Apprentices had been expanded with an electrical and ordnance branch. The entire operation was concentrated in Fisgard at Portsmouth, before being moved to Chatham in 1930. The decision was made to move ashore and by July 1932 all of the hulks had been sold off with the exception of Fisgard IV, the old HMS Sultan. She was renamed HMS Sultan and retained as a depot ship. The establishment remained ashore at Chatham until 1939, when the pressures of the Second World War brought more apprentices into the service. At the same time the risk of German bombs led to the decision to disperse the base's resources. Two new training establishments were established, one at Rosyth, Scotland and another at Torpoint, Cornwall in October 1940. The Scottish branch was named HMS Caledonia and the Cornish one was named RNATE (Royal Navy Artificer Training Establishment) Torpoint. RNATE Torpoint was commissioned as HMS Fisgard in December 1946. HMS Sultan remained as the depot ship until being sold on 13 August 1946.

=== Postwar ===
After the end of the war and by the late 1940s the artificer training was concentrated back into Fisgard, taking on the shipwright and Fleet Air Arm apprentices; Fleet Air Arm apprentices were for sometime prior to 1946 inducted at H.M.S. Daedalus Lee-on Solent for the first three weeks after entry and then divided into two with one half going to RNATE Torpoint and the other half to HMS 'Caledonia'. After one year both halves would then re-join at HMS 'Condor', Arbroath Scotland for the next three years of their apprenticeship. They would commence that period with the trade specialisation with for which they had been assessed at the end of the first year. After 1946 when direct entry into the Fleet Air Arm finished the 'Series' Entry system commenced. 'Fisgard' was commissioned as an independent command on 1 December 1946. By 1950 all Artificer Apprentices were recruited at HMS Fisgard to spend 16 month there for initial training in all the trades. They were then sent off to either HMS Collingwood (Electrical), HMS Condor (Aircraft) or HMS Caledonia (Engineroom, Ordnance & Shipwright) to complete the four-year shore-based training. The final year was spent as Leading Hand Artificers with a ship at sea. During the 1980s, further training was carried out by the apprentices at either HMS Caledonia (Rosyth) (then later at HMS Sultan, Gosport) for Marine Engineering specialisation, HMS Collingwood (Fareham) for Weapons Electrical specialisation or HMS Daedalus (Lee on Solent) for Air Electrical Engineering specialisation. The base continued in service until 21 December 1983, when it was absorbed into HMS Raleigh, which retained a Fisgard squadron to train artificers and engineers until the decision was taken to end the separate role of artificers. The Artificer Apprentices museum was situated here. When HMS Fisgard closed (August 1983) the Fisgard Museum was moved to HMS Raleigh and housed in the Fisgard Squadron. When the Fisgard Squadron closed in 1997 moving to new premises as the Fisgard Division, The Fisgard Museum was moved to HMS Sultan to become part of the Marine Engineering Museum which had been set up in 1985 and which also houses records and Artefacts from HMS Caledonia. Although still known by many ex Artificers as the Fisgard Museum, it was renamed on its absorption into the Mechanical Engineering (ME) Museum.
