= HMS Saracen (P247) =

S-class submarine of the Royal Navy

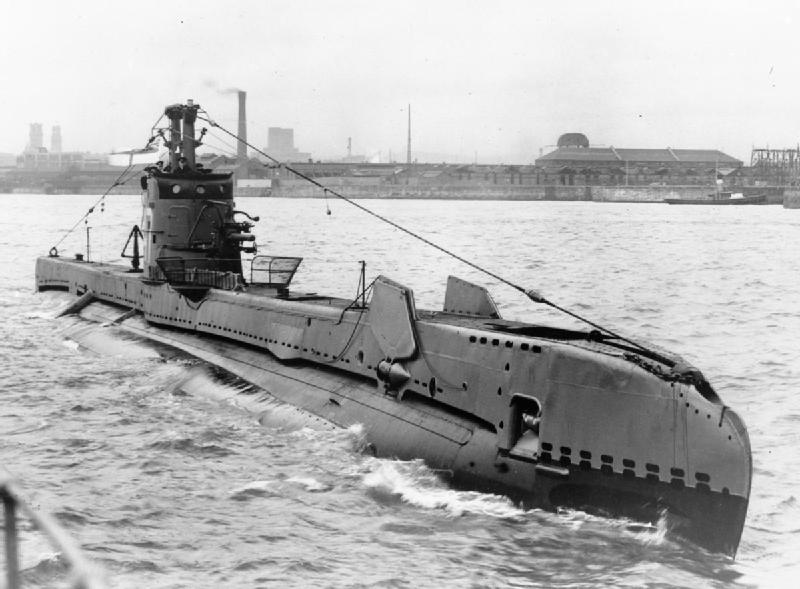
- Saracen on the River Mersey in July 1942

History

United Kingdom
- Name: Saracen
- Ordered: 23 January 1940
- Builder: Cammell Laird, Birkenhead
- Laid down: 16 July 1940
- Launched: 16 February 1942
- Commissioned: 27 June 1942
- Identification: Pennant number: P247
- Fate: Sunk, 14 August 1943

General characteristics
- Class & type: S-class submarine
- Displacement: 865 long tons (879 t) (surfaced); 990 long tons (1,010 t) (submerged)
- Length: 217 ft (66.1 m)
- Beam: 23 ft 9 in (7.2 m)
- Draught: 14 ft 8 in (4.5 m)
- Installed power: 1,900 bhp (1,400 kW) (diesel); 1,300 hp (970 kW) (electric)
- Propulsion: 2 × diesel engines; 2 × electric motors
- Speed: 15 kn (28 km/h; 17 mph) (surfaced); 10 kn (19 km/h; 12 mph) (submerged)
- Range: 6,000 nmi (11,000 km; 6,900 mi) at 10 knots (19 km/h; 12 mph) (surfaced); 120 nmi (220 km; 140 mi) at 3 knots (5.6 km/h; 3.5 mph) (submerged)
- Test depth: 300 ft (91.4 m)
- Complement: 48
- Sensors & processing systems: Type 129AR or 138 ASDIC; Type 291 early-warning radar
- Armament: 7 × 21 in (533 mm) torpedo tubes (6 × bow, 1 × stern); 1 × 3 in (76 mm) deck gun

HMS Saracen was a third-batch S-class submarine built for the Royal Navy during the Second World War. Completed in 1942, Saracen conducted a patrol in the North Sea where she sank a German U-boat. She was then assigned to the 10th Submarine Flotilla in Malta, from where she made three patrols; on her second, she sank an Italian submarine. Saracen was then reassigned to the 8th Submarine Flotilla, based in Algiers, French North Africa.

Operating from there, she conducted six patrols, sinking seven ships and landing agents in Corsica and Sardinia. On her twelfth patrol, Saracen was heavily damaged by two depth charge attacks from Italian destroyers. On 13 August 1943, Saracen was detected by two Italian corvettes and again attacked with depth charges. With several leaks in her pressure hull, the submarine surfaced and her crewmen abandoned ship. She was then scuttled and 46 out of 48 men were rescued by the Italian ships. Saracen's wreck was discovered in 2015 off Corsica.

== Design and description ==
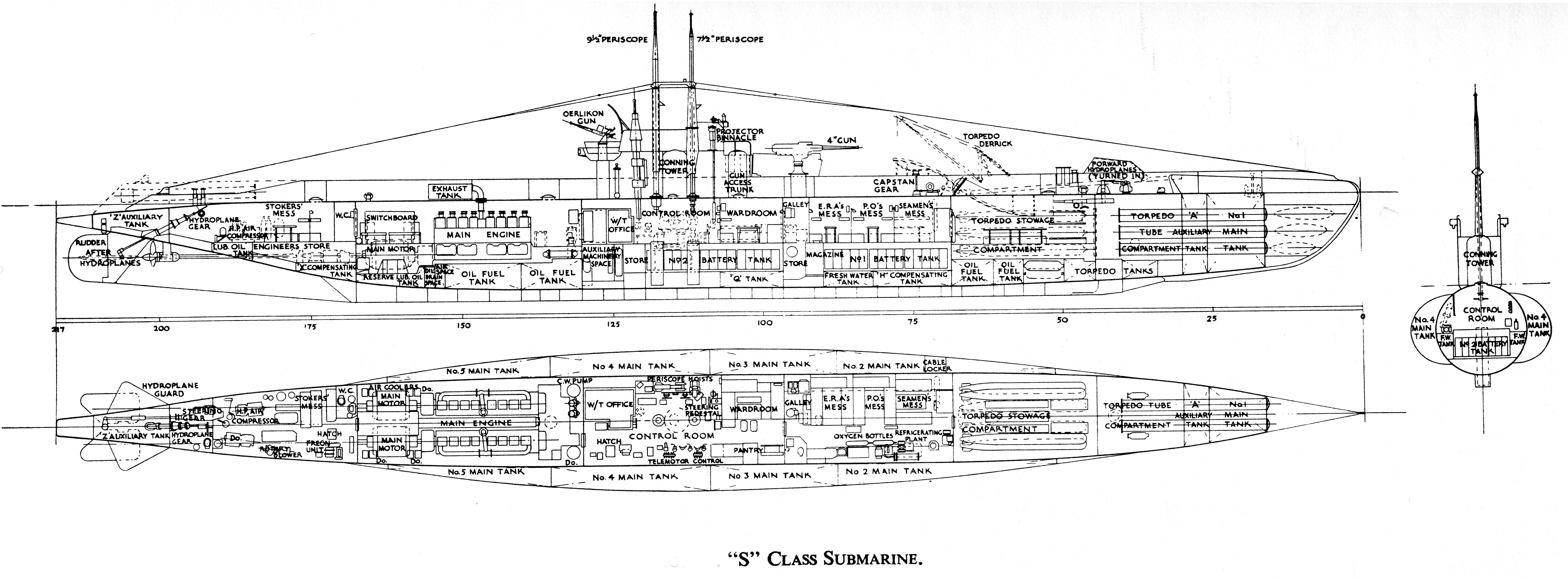
Schematic drawing of a S-class submarine

The S-class submarines were designed to patrol the restricted waters of the North Sea and the Mediterranean Sea. The third batch was slightly enlarged and improved over the preceding second batch of the S class. The submarines had a length of 217 feet (66.1 m) overall, a beam of 23 feet 9 inches (7.2 m) and a draught of 14 feet 8 inches (4.5 m). They displaced 865 long tons (879 t) on the surface and 990 long tons (1,010 t) submerged. The S-class submarines had a crew of 48 officers and ratings. They had a diving depth of 300 feet (91 m).

For surface running, the boats were powered by two 950-brake-horsepower (708 kW) diesel engines, each driving one propeller shaft. When submerged each propeller was driven by a 650-horsepower (485 kW) electric motor. They could reach 15 knots (28 km/h; 17 mph) on the surface and 10 knots (19 km/h; 12 mph) underwater. On the surface, the third-batch boats had a range of 6,000 nautical miles (11,000 km; 6,900 mi) at 10 knots (19 km/h; 12 mph) and 120 nmi (220 km; 140 mi) at 3 knots (5.6 km/h; 3.5 mph) submerged.

The third-batch submarines were armed with seven 21-inch (533 mm) torpedo tubes. Six of these were in the bow and there was one external tube in the stern. They carried six reload torpedoes for the bow tubes for a total of thirteen torpedoes. Twelve mines could be carried in lieu of the internally stowed torpedoes. They were also armed with a 3-inch (76 mm) deck gun. The third-batch S-class boats were fitted with either a Type 129AR or 138 ASDIC system and a Type 291 or 291W early-warning radar.

== Construction and career ==
HMS Saracen was a third-batch S-class submarine and was ordered by the Admiralty on 23 January 1940. She was laid down in the Cammell Laird Shipyard in Birkenhead on 16 July 1940, and launched on 16 February 1942. On 24 June 1942, Saracen, under the command of Lieutenant M.G.R. Lumby, sailed from the shipbuilding yards to Holy Loch, where she was commissioned into the Royal Navy three days later as P247.

During the following month Saracen conducted training exercises, then departed harbour for her first war patrol, off Norway, on 29 July 1942. After only five days at sea on 3 August, the boat torpedoed and sank the German submarine U-335 in the North Sea, northeast of the Faroe Islands. Only one of the U-boat's crew of 44 was rescued, while a second sailor declined rescue and drowned. U-335 was also on its first patrol. Saracen's First Lieutenant, Edward Preston Young, was mentioned in dispatches for his part in the action. Saracen ended her patrol in Lerwick on 9 August, then transferred to Holy Loch, arriving on the 11th.

On 31 August, Saracen was ordered to conduct a special patrol off Cape Finisterre, Spain, to intercept a possible German blockade runner. Having sighted nothing, the submarine was ordered to continue to Gibraltar, and arrived there on 4 September. After exercises off Gibraltar, Saracen conducted a patrol in the Alboran Sea from 17 to 27 September but sighted no potential targets.

=== Malta ===
Saracen was assigned to the British 10th Submarine Flotilla in Malta, and sailed to her new home port on 9 October 1942. The next day, she sighted the surfaced German submarine U-605 and fired six torpedoes at it, but the U-boat spotted the torpedo tracks and passed between them. The British submarine then surfaced to use her deck gun, but her opponent dived after only three rounds had been fired, and Saracen dived. One hour and a half later, Saracen surfaced again to signal the presence of the enemy submarine and was spotted by U-605 which had remained in the area. U-605 fired four torpedoes at the British submarine, but also missed. The torpedoes were not noticed on board the British submarine, which then received orders to leave the area to allow surface ships to hunt U-605. Having expended half of her torpedoes, Saracen returned to Gibraltar to load new ones, then left for Malta on a different route following the sinking of the submarine HMS Talisman on the QBB.255 route. The boat arrived safely in Malta on 19 October.

From 21 to 24 October, Saracen conducted a patrol between the Kerkennah Islands and the Kuriat archipelago further north. She did not sight any ships on this patrol, and returned to port after three days.

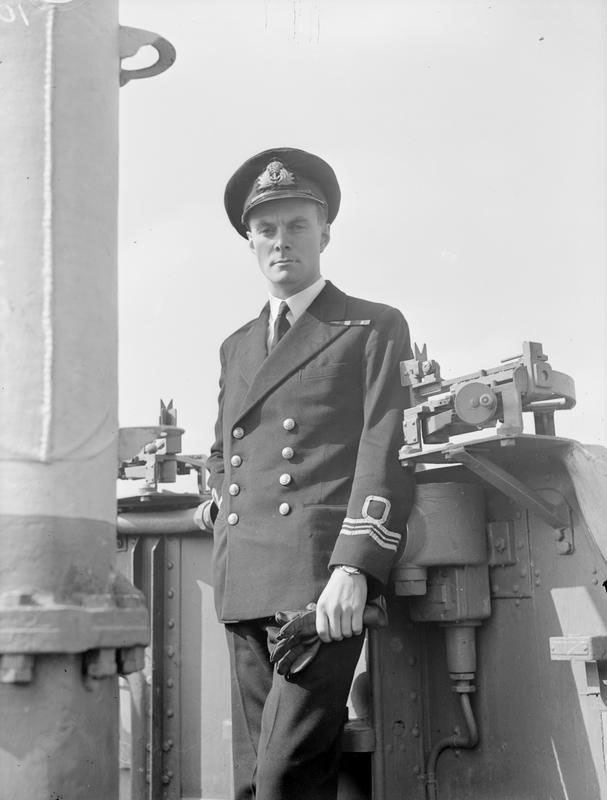
Saracen's First Lieutenant in 1942, Edward Preston Young

On 3 November 1942, Saracen along with her sister ships Safari and Sahib, departed Malta for a patrol off North Africa to cover the Allied landings in North Africa. On her way to the patrol area, the submarine was attacked by German Messerschmitt Bf 109 fighter-bombers, sustaining slight damage to her wireless transmitter. Originally ordered to patrol off Partinico, Sicily, Saracen's orders were changed to operate in the Strait of Sicily, between Tunisia and Sicily. On 9 November 1942, she torpedoed and sank the Acciaio-class submarine Granito approximately 40 nautical miles (74 km; 46 mi) northwest of Partinico, Sicily; Granito went down with all hands, in total 46 men. Following the sinking, Young was awarded the Distinguished Service Cross for his part in the action. One week later, Saracen launched three torpedoes at the German merchant ship Menes in the Gulf of Tunis, but missed, and the boat returned to Malta on 24 November.

Saracen departed Malta again on 7 December 1942, with orders to patrol off Naples, Italy, then later, eastern Tunisia. On 17 December, she missed the German transport Ankara with four torpedoes north of Bizerte, Tunisia. On 22 December, Saracen twice sighted the Italian submarine Argento, but failed to manoeuvre into a suitable attack position. Argento also sighted the British submarine, but did not attack it because it might have been her sister Italian submarine Corallo. Saracen ended her patrol on Christmas 1942 in Algiers, where she joined the 8th Submarine Flotilla.

=== Algiers ===
On 10 January 1943, Saracen departed Algiers for her seventh war patrol, close to Naples, in the Tyrrhenian Sea. About 30 nautical miles (56 km; 35 mi) south of the island of Capri, the submarine sank the Italian patrol boat Maria Angeletta with gunfire on 20 January. On 22 and 23 January, Saracen missed a small oil tanker and an unidentified ship with four torpedoes each, then returned to Algiers on the 27th.

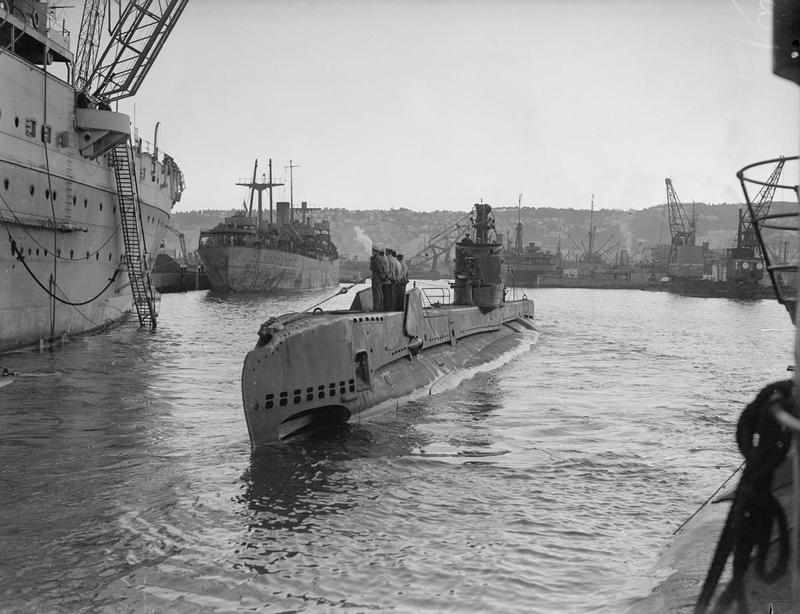
Saracen at Algiers, 7 February

Saracen commenced another patrol in the Gulf of Genoa on 7 February. In the early morning of 11 February, the submarine landed three men in Cupabia, south of Ajaccio, Corsica. The next day, she sank with gunfire the Vichy French tugboats Provinçale II and Marseillaise V off Cape Sardineaux, southern France. On 15 February, Saracen, until then called HMS P247, was officially given her name Saracen, then later in the day she torpedoed and damaged the German oil tanker Marguerite Finaly. On 19 February, Saracen surfaced and fired her deck gun into a small shipbuilding yard at Cervo, Italy. Two ships under construction were damaged before the boat was forced to submerge due to fire from coastal batteries. Saracen returned to Algiers on 22 February.

On 25 February 1943, Saracen departed for Malta, then left Malta on 16 March to conduct a patrol north of Sicily. Two days later, she sighted two German landing craft, but did not attack them due to their shallow draft, which would have caused torpedoes to run under. On 20 March Saracen sighted an Italian convoy of two merchant ships, four destroyers, and sixteen aircraft, but she was detected by one of the escorting ships' sonar, which foiled the attack. On 1 April, the boat returned to Algiers, ending her patrol.

Saracen left harbour again on 13 March to conduct a patrol in the Gulf of Genoa. On 19 April, she sighted an Italian convoy and sank the Italian cargo/passenger ship Francesco Crispi with six torpedoes off Elba. Francesco Crispi was transporting 1,085 soldiers to Bastia, and Saracen was attacked with depth charges by the escorting ships, but was not damaged. The submarine then torpedoed and sank the Italian merchantman Tagliamento three days later, 35 nautical miles (65 km; 40 mi) south of the island of Pianosa, Italy; according to Saracen's logbook, "A sheet of orange flame went up hundreds of feet into the air and burning debris hurtled in all directions. As Saracen was diving the bridge of the merchant vessel flew overhead". The boat ended her patrol in Algiers on 27 April.

Between 9 and 25 May, Saracen conducted a patrol northeast of Sardinia, but did not sight any ships.

On 27 June, the submarine departed Algiers to patrol east of Corsica and provide cover for the Allied landings in Sicily. Shortly after leaving port, Saracen was spotted and identified by the German submarine U-593, but the U-boat had been ordered not to attack submarines in the area and let Saracen proceed unharmed. After midnight on 2 July, Saracen landed six men off Cape Palmeri, Sardinia, then torpedoed and sank the Italian merchant ship Tripoli 15 nautical miles (28 km; 17 mi) south of Capraia, Italy on 6 July. Four days later, the submarine was detected with Asdic by an Italian destroyer 15 nautical miles (28 km; 17 mi) east of Bastia, which dropped 27 depth charges, causing considerable damage aboard Saracen. The next day, the boat torpedoed and sank the German merchantman Tell and was again depth charged, causing more damage. Saracen returned to Algiers on 21 July.

=== Last patrol and sinking ===
Location of Saracen's wreck

After repairs in Algiers, Saracen scuttled the beached ammunition ship SS Fort La Montee with her deck gun, then commenced a patrol, again east of Corsica, on 7 August; this was to be her last patrol. Shortly after midnight of 13 August, Saracen was detected on sonar by the Italian Gabbiano-class corvette Minerva; the corvette dropped six patterns of depth charges for a total of 40. Saracen initially attempted to escape by diving deep but at a depth of 220 metres (720 ft) several depth charges exploded close to the submarine, starting leaks in her pressure hull. Saracen was forced to surface and was fired upon by Minerva and her sister ship Euterpe's surface guns. Saracen's crew abandoned ship and the submarine was scuttled to prevent her capture by the Italians. Forty-six crewmen were picked up, twenty by Euterpe and twenty-six by Minerva; two ratings went missing.

Ironically, Saracen was sunk shortly after midnight of a Friday the 13th, and this patrol was Saracen's 13th as well. In 2015, her wreck was discovered and photographed on the seabed, at a depth of 1,400 feet (430 m) off the coast of Corsica.

== Summary of raiding history ==
During her service with the Royal Navy Saracen sank 7 ships for a total of 16,039 GRT as well as a German and an Italian U-boat.

Date	Name of ship	Tonnage	Nationality	Fate and location
3 August 1942	German submarine U-335	-	Nazi Germany	Torpedoed and sunk at 62°48′N 00°12′W
9 November 1942	Italian submarine Granito	-	Kingdom of Italy	Torpedoed and sunk at 38°34′N 12°09′E
20 January 1943	Maria Angeletta	214	Kingdom of Italy	Sunk with gunfire at 40°14′N 14°10′E
12 February 1943	Provençale-2	124	Vichy France	Sunk with gunfire at 43°20′N 06°48′E
12 February 1943	Marseillaise V	138	Vichy France	Sunk with gunfire at 43°20′N 06°48′E
19 April 1943	Francesco Crispi	7,600	Kingdom of Italy	Torpedoed and sank at 42°46′N 09°42′E
22 April 1943	Tagliamento	5,448	Kingdom of Italy	Torpedoed and sank at 42°03′N 09°48′E
6 July 1943	Tripoli	1,166	Kingdom of Italy	Torpedoed and sank at 42°45′N 09°51′E
11 July 1943	Tell	1,349	Nazi Germany	Torpedoed and sank at 42°45′N 09°51′E
