= HMS Umpire (N82) =

Submarine of the Royal Navy

Coordinates: 53°09′N 1°06′E

- HMS Umpire

History

United Kingdom
- Builder: Chatham Dockyard
- Laid down: 1 January 1940
- Launched: 30 December 1940
- Commissioned: 10 July 1941
- Fate: Sunk in collision 19 July 1941
- Badge

General characteristics
- Displacement: Surfaced - 540 tons standard, 630 tons full load; Submerged - 730 tons
- Length: 60 m (196 ft 10 in)
- Beam: 4.90 m (16 ft 1 in)
- Draught: 4.62 m (15 ft 2 in)
- Propulsion: 2 shaft diesel-electric; 2 Paxman Ricardo diesel generators + electric motors; 615 / 825 hp
- Speed: 11.25 knots (20.8 km/h) max surfaced; 10 knots (19 km/h) max submerged
- Complement: 31
- Armament: 4 bow internal 21 inch (533 mm) torpedo tubes - 8 torpedoes; 1 - 3-inch (76 mm) gun

HMS Umpire (N82) was a Royal Navy U-class submarine built at Chatham Dockyard and sunk in an accident nine days after commissioning in July 1941 with the loss of 22 men. The submarine was sunk while en route from Chatham to join the 3rd Submarine Flotilla at Dunoon, under the command of Lieutenant Mervyn Wingfield. From Dunoon she was to carry out a single working-up patrol in the North Sea before heading to the Mediterranean. She stopped overnight at Sheerness and joined a convoy headed North. The submarine suffered engine failure with one of the two diesel engines and as a result fell behind the convoy; the propellers were driven purely by electric motors on the surface and when submerged with no mechanical linkage to the diesel engines. The convoy passed a Southbound convoy around midnight while about 12 nautical miles (22 km) off Blakeney, Norfolk, with the two convoys passing starboard to starboard; this was unusual since ships and convoys should pass port to port. No ships showed any lights because of the risk from German E-boats. However, an armed escort trawler, Peter Hendriks in the southbound convoy accidentally struck Umpire sinking her in 18 metres of water.

Four crew members were on the bridge when the submarine sank - Wingfield, the navigator and two lookouts. However, only Wingfield survived in the cold water to be picked up by the trawler. Several other personnel also survived, escaping from the sunken wreck using the conning tower or the engine room escape hatch, the majority wearing DSEA. Chief ERA Killen received a British Empire Medal for leaving the submarine wearing DSEA to check for obstructions around the engine room hatch and then returning to the engine room to assist the other crew members in escaping. He remained in the engine room until everyone else there had escaped. 17 of the crew successfully escaped, 16 crew and one civilian were lost.

Lieutenant Edward Young, one of the survivors from Umpire, later went on to command HMS Storm.

The wreck is designated as a protected place under the Protection of Military Remains Act 1986.
