= HMS H49 =

Submarine of the Royal Navy

History

United Kingdom
- Name: H49
- Builder: William Beardmore and Company, Dalmuir
- Launched: 15 July 1919
- Commissioned: 25 October 1919
- Fate: Sunk, 18 October 1940

General characteristics
- Class & type: H-class submarine
- Displacement: 423 long tons (430 t) surfaced; 510 long tons (518 t) submerged
- Length: 171 ft 0 in (52.12 m)
- Beam: 15 ft 4 in (4.67 m)
- Propulsion: 1 × 480 hp (358 kW) diesel engine; 2 × 620 hp (462 kW) electric motors
- Speed: 11.5 knots (21.3 km/h; 13.2 mph) surfaced; 9 knots (17 km/h; 10 mph) submerged
- Range: 2,985 nmi (5,528 km) at 7.5 kn (13.9 km/h; 8.6 mph) surfaced; 130 nmi (240 km) at 2 kn (3.7 km/h; 2.3 mph) submerged
- Complement: 22
- Armament: 4 × 21 in (533 mm) bow torpedo tubes; 8 × 21-inch torpedoes

HMS H49 was a British H-class submarine built by William Beardmore and Company, Dalmuir. She was launched on 15 July 1919 and commissioned on 25 October 1919. The submarine saw active service in the Second World War, but was sunk off the Netherlands by German patrol vessels on 18 October 1940.

== Design ==
Like all post-H20 British H-class submarines, H49 had a displacement of 423 long tons (430 t) at the surface and 510 long tons (520 t) while submerged. It had a total length of 171 feet (52 m), a beam of 15 feet 4 inches (4.67 m), and a draught of 39 feet 4 inches (12 m). It contained diesel engines providing a total power of 480 horsepower (360 kW) and two electric motors each providing 320 horsepower (240 kW). The use of its electric motors made the submarine travel at 11 knots (20 km/h; 13 mph). It would normally carry 16.4 long tons (16.7 t) of fuel and had a maximum capacity of 18 long tons (18 t).

The submarine had a maximum surface speed of 13 knots (24 km/h; 15 mph) and a submerged speed of 10.5 knots (19.4 km/h; 12.1 mph). Post-H20 British H-class submarines had ranges of 2,985 nautical miles (5,528 km; 3,435 mi) at speeds of 7.5 knots (13.9 km/h; 8.6 mph) when surfaced. H49 was fitted with an anti-aircraft gun and four 21-inch (533 mm) torpedo tubes. Its torpedo tubes were fitted to the bow and the submarine was loaded with eight 21-inch torpedoes. It is a Holland 602 type submarine but was designed to meet Royal Navy specifications. Its complement was twenty-two crew members.

== Construction and service ==
H49 was laid down at William Beardmore and Company's Dalmuir shipyard on 21 January 1918, was launched on 15 July 1919 and completed on 25 October 1919.

Following commissioning, H49 joined the submarine training school at Portland. She remained part of this establishment in December 1920.

In March 1937 the submarine navigated the Gloucester and Sharpness Canal in the company of the submarine HMS H33. The trip had been arranged by Lieutenant A.F Collett, the 1st Lieutenant of H33. She was reduced to reserve at Portsmouth on 16 December 1938.

H49 survived until the Second World War, when she was assigned with other H-class submarines to a training flotilla at Harwich. Following the fall of France in June 1940, these training submarines undertook operational patrols in the North Sea as an anti-invasion precaution. On 16 September 1940, H49 commanded by Lieutenant M A Langley, fired four torpedoes at a large enemy coastal convoy and sank a 2,189-ton ship; Langley was later awarded the Distinguished Service Cross for this action. On 1 October, the submarine fired four torpedoes at a six-ship convoy, but without success.

On the afternoon of 18 October, under the command of Lieutenant R E Coltart DSC, H49 was on her "billet" (prescribed patrol area) off the Dutch coast, when the unusual decision was taken to surface in daylight, probably presuming that the poor visibility would prevent their being sighted. However, they had not detected a nearby group of five German armed trawlers or Vorpostenboote of the 11th Anti-Submarine Flotilla, who attacked immediately. Despite diving at once, H49 was sunk by depth charges from the German patrol craft UJ111, UJ116 and UJ118, commanded by Lieutenant-Commander Wolfgang Kaden aboard UJ116, off Texel, the Netherlands. There was only one survivor, Leading Stoker George William Oliver from Hartlepool. He was rescued by German trawlers and spent the rest of the war as a prisoner of war at Marlag M. Following the loss of H49, operational patrols by the other H-class submarines were suspended, and the flotilla moved to Rosyth in December 1940 to resume training duties.

In the mid-1980s amateur divers who had violated H49's war grave status were prosecuted by the Dutch government. Following research by Dennis Feary, the son of one of H49's lost crew members, he arranged for a memorial plaque to the submarine to be placed in St Mary's Church, Shotley in 2019, and a display dedicated to the sinking at the Aeronautical and War Museum on Texel Island.

== See also ==
- List of submarines of the Second World War

== Bibliography ==
- Colledge, J. J.; Warlow, Ben (2006) [1969]. Ships of the Royal Navy: The Complete Record of All Fighting Ships of the Royal Navy from the 15th Century to the Present (3rd Rev ed.). London: Chatham Publishing. ISBN 978-1-86176-281-8. OCLC 67375475.
- Evans, A S (2010). Beneath the Waves: A History of HM Submarine Losses 1904-1971. Barnsley, S Yorkshire: Pen & Sword Maritime. ISBN 978-1848842922.
- Harrison, A. N. (January 1979). "The Development of HM Submarines From Holland No. 1 (1901) to Porpoise (1930) (BR3043)". United Kingdom Ministry of Defence – via RN Subs.
- Hezlet, Arthur Richard (2001). British and allied submarine operations in World War II. Gosport: Royal Navy Submarine Museum. ISBN 978-0952669616.
- Hutchinson, Robert (2001). Jane's submarines : war beneath the waves from 1776 to the present day. London: HarperCollins. ISBN 978-0007105588.
- Paterson, Lawrence (2018). Hitler's Forgotten Flotillas: Kriegsmarine Security Forces. Barnsley, UK: Pen & Sword Books. ISBN 978-1473882393.
- Young, Edward (1997). One of Our Submarines. Ware, Hertfordshire: Wordsworth Editions. ISBN 978-1853266812.
