= HMS Fisgard (1819) =

Frigate of the Royal Navy

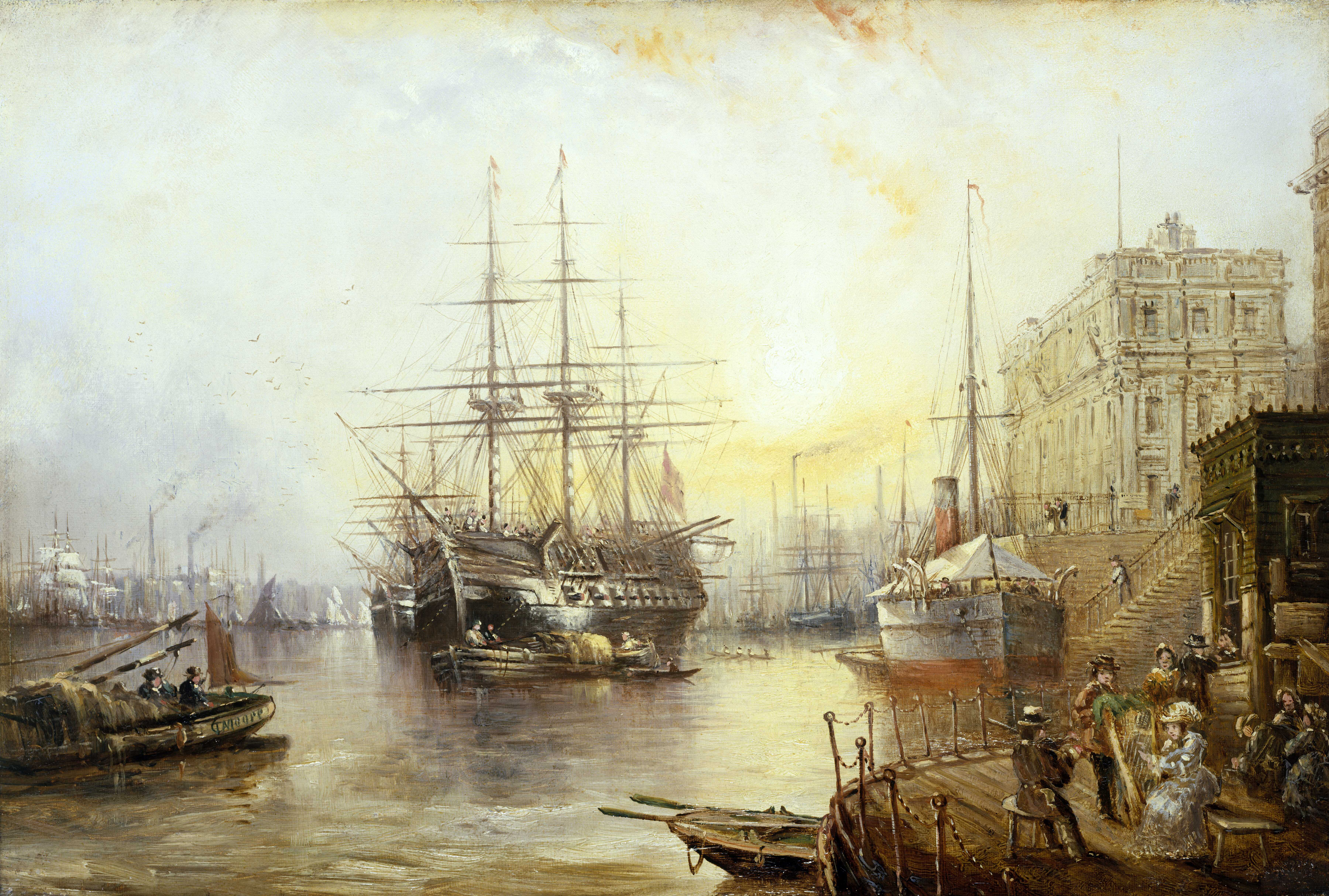
- HMS Fisgard (middle), HMS Arrow (right) at Greenwich

History

United Kingdom
- Name: HMS Fisgard
- Ordered: 24 August 1815
- Builder: Pembroke Dockyard
- Laid down: February 1817
- Launched: 8 July 1819
- Commissioned: 27 August 1819
- Fate: Broken up by 8 October 1879

General characteristics
- Class & type: 46-gun Leda-class fifth-rate frigate
- Tons burthen: 1,062 bm
- Length: 150 ft 1.5 in (45.758 m)
- Beam: 39 ft 11 in (12.17 m)
- Draught: 12 ft 9 in (3.89 m)
- Sail plan: Full-rigged ship
- Complement: 315
- Armament: 46 guns: Upper gundeck: 28 × 18-pdr cannon; Quarterdeck: 14 × 32-pdr carronades; Forecastle: 2 × 9-pdr cannon and 2 × 32-pdr carronades

HMS Fisgard was a 46-gun fifth rate Leda-class frigate of the Royal Navy. She spent sixty years in service on a variety of duties.

== Construction and commissioning ==
Fisgard was a continuation of the successful Leda class that had been designed by Sir John Henslow and served during the Napoleonic Wars. They had their armament increased from the earlier ships of that class, and mounted 46 guns instead of 38. Fisgard was ordered on 24 August 1815 from Pembroke Dockyard and was laid down in February 1817. She was launched on 8 July 1819 and commissioned on 27 August 1819, having cost a total of £23,493.

== Career ==
Having been accepted into service, she was laid up in ordinary for 24 years, only being activated in 1843. She came under the command of Captain John Alexander Duntze on 13 May 1843 and spent some time in the Pacific, which included an assignment to assess the naval potential of Fort Victoria in what would eventually become the capital of British Columbia. On 18 September 1847, during a voyage from Rio de Janeiro, Brazil, to Portsmouth, Hampshire, she ran aground off East Cowes, Isle of Wight; she was refloated.

Fisgard returned to Woolwich, where she was designated as the harbour flagship and was fitted for a commodore. Commodore James John Gordon Bremer hoisted his flag aboard her on 24 October 1847, the first of a number of such officers. On 20 December 1858 Fisgard became the flagship of Commodore James Robert Drummond, the commander-in-chief at Woolwich. In 1861, she was the guard-ship of the Port of London. Her last commodore was William Edmonstone, who took command on 6 April 1868. Between 1848 and 1872 she was used to train engineers for the navy, and was the nominated depot ship for personnel stationed ashore. Additionally, between 1853 and 1873 she served as the Headquarters ship of the Royal Naval Coast Volunteers.

== Decommissioning ==
Fisgard was eventually paid off for breaking up, a process completed at Chatham by 8 October 1879. She would give her name to the later shore establishment named HMS Fisgard, which would go on to train engineers and artificers during the late nineteenth century and into the twentieth.

== Legacy ==
Fisgard Lighthouse National Historic Site and Fisgard Street (Victoria) in British Columbia, Canada are named after the vessel.
