= Royal Naval Artillery Volunteers =

Former British military reserve force

- An 1873 engraving showing men of the Royal Naval Artillery Volunteers being inspected by the Second Sea Lord, Rear Admiral John Tarleton aboard HMS President.
- Active: 1873–April 1892
- Country: United Kingdom
- Branch: Navy
- Role: Volunteer reserve
- Size: Circa 1,900 men (1891)

The Royal Naval Artillery Volunteers (RNAV, sometimes referred to as the Royal Naval Artillery Reserve) was a British military reserve force between 1873 and 1892. The force absorbed the men of the earlier Royal Naval Coast Volunteers and was intended to provide men to the Royal Navy in time of war. However, unlike the contemporary Royal Naval Reserve, the men of the RNAV did not necessarily have sea-going experience. It proved difficult to find a role for them (proposals that they man torpedo boats were rejected by the Royal Navy) and an 1891 report by Vice Admiral George Tryon recommended that the RNAV be disbanded. This came into effect in April 1892 with members of the RNAV being urged to join the army's Volunteer Force. The unit is considered a predecessor of the more successful Royal Naval Volunteer Reserve, founded in 1903.

== Formation and service ==
Royal Naval Artillery Volunteers parade to Westminster Abbey in 1877

The Royal Naval Artillery Volunteers (RNAV) were authorised by the Naval Artillery Volunteer Act 1873 (36 & 37 Vict. c. 77). It was, with the Royal Naval Reserve (RNR), one of two reserve corps that could be used to supplement the Royal Navy in time of war. The RNR was originally a reserve of trained seamen only, though by this time it had expanded to include reserve officers. The RNAV was "composed of men who had not, as a rule, practical acquaintance with the sea, but who had nautical sympathies and aspirations" and included officers and ratings. The RNAV absorbed the men of the Royal Naval Coast Volunteers (disbanded 1873) who had not been transferred to the RNR.

The RNAV were organised into brigades of four or more batteries; the brigades were numbered and named after a locality. Each battery was commanded by a sub-lieutenant (chosen by the brigade commander) and consisted of a chief petty officer, 2 first class petty officers, 2 second class petty officers, 2 buglers and 51-71 leading gunners or gunners (the latter were the RNAV equivalent of the navy's leading seaman and able seaman ranks), all volunteers. As well as the volunteers the battery was provided with a full-time first class petty officer. Each brigade was commanded by a lieutenant and additionally had a full-time staff of a lieutenant-instructor, a surgeon, a bugle major and armourer. Each brigade could also appoint honorary commanders, staff-surgeons and chaplains, though such men were not liable for active service and their appointments would be automatically terminated if the RNAV were mobilised.

The officers held Admiralty commissions and their rank was equivalent to that of the Royal Navy, but they came after naval and RNR officers in precedence. Members of the RNAV were required to salute officers of the Royal Navy, British Army and other auxiliary forces and to be saluted by the same. Admission was open to men aged 17 or over, though buglers could be as young as 14. Serving army or navy officers were not permitted to join. In times of need the unit would be mobilised by royal proclamation upon which each member would be liable to serve on any Royal Navy vessel or tender. The men of the RNAV were restricted to serving on or near the British coast and could not be employed aloft (in the masts, rigging or smoke stacks) or as stokers (tending the fires in the boiler rooms). Discipline was under the Naval Artillery Volunteers Act in peacetime but the Naval Discipline Act when assembled with the regular forces for training or in camp (in which circumstances the RNAV were placed under the command of a Royal Navy officer).

The RNAV trained using the Royal Navy artillery, rifle, pistol and cutlass drills. All men were required to attend two drills each month until they were passed as "efficient". Men rated efficient wore a silver lace chevron on their right sleeve; those that rated efficient five times wore a star above the chevron and those rated ten times wore two stars. In addition, men who passed the Royal Navy's "trained man" standard wore two chevrons. In 1891 the unit numbered some 66 officers and 1,849 ratings. The previous year some 633 recruits were admitted, showing the unit had a high turnover of members.

== Uniform ==
RNAV ratings wore similar uniforms to those in the Royal Navy, except that some line detail, straight in the navy, was wavy in the RNAV uniform. For example, the white version of the navy rig had three wavy white lines on the trim of the blue collar and sleeve cuffs. The officers also wore similar uniforms to Royal Navy officers, a double breasted pea coat with five rows of brass buttons. Rank insignia was in wavy gold lace, rather than straight, and topped with a six-pointed star rather than the Royal Navy's curl. Uniform buttons, sword belts and cap badges were marked with the initials "RNAV" and on officers' epaulettes the lettering "R.N.A. Volunteers" replaced the Royal Navy anchor. Officers could wear a cocked hat, but with silver detail rather than the gold of the navy. Other ranks' cap tally bands were marked with a crown and anchor and the letters "RNAV", whereas the navy used ship names.

== Disbandment ==
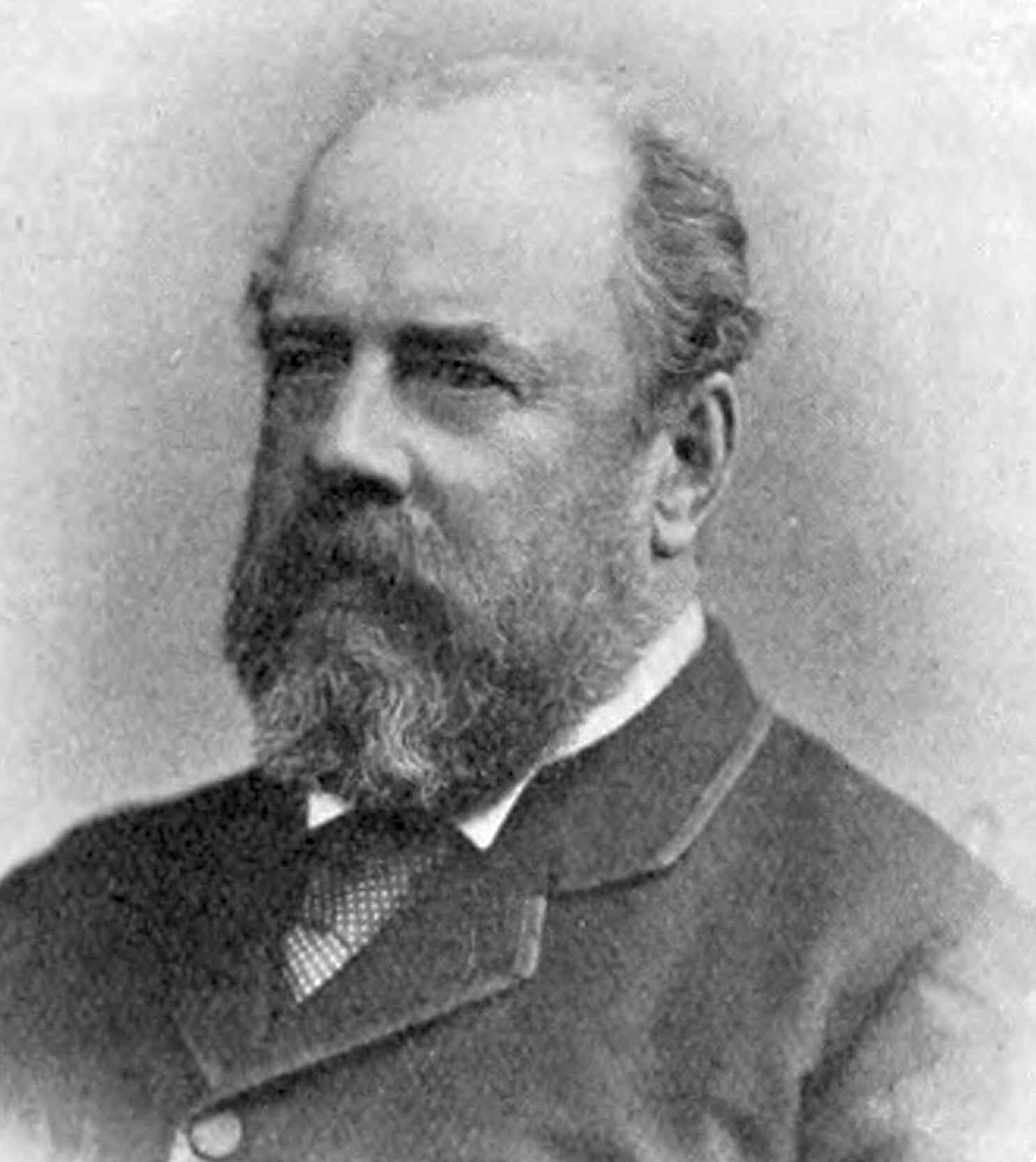
Vice Admiral George Tryon

The RNAV struggled to find a role for its members in wartime. An 1889 meeting of its senior officers looked at ways of providing useful skills for its members but its proposals were rejected on difficulty and cost grounds. A suggestion that gunboats, partly manned by the navy, be provided to each brigade for use as training ships was rejected on cost grounds. A suggestion that RNAV officers be granted higher ranks was rejected by the Royal Navy due to possible difficulties if the unit were mobilised; the navy considered that executive ranks should only be granted to officers qualified to perform wartime duties. A proposal that the RNAV be used to man torpedo boats in wartime was rejected as the navy considered such vessels were involved in some of the most strenuous work of the fleet. Lilley, writing in 2012, considers that the unit was "not really wanted by the Navy".

A committee on the future of the RNAV, chaired by Vice Admiral George Tryon, sat in 1891. The committee found that an efficient means of mobilising the RNAV had not been developed, despite numerous attempts, and that no war time role for its members had been found, due to their lack of experience at sea. It stated that if a Royal Marine Artillery reserve were to be formed then the former members of the RNAV might join that. (Note: The Royal Marines Forces Volunteer Reserve would not be established until 1948.) In the absence of a Royal Marine reserve the committee suggested that former RNAV members might join the submarine mining units of the Volunteer Force, but doubted that many would do so. (Note: These were army engineering units that specialised in laying defensive mines in the period before such work became the responsibility of the Royal Navy. For examples see Category:Submarine mining units of the Royal Engineers) The committee found that the RNAV failed to justify its government funding and also noted that all other attempts to form a naval reserve had failed, apart from the RNR which was composed entirely of trained seamen. The committee's report of 7 April 1891 recommended that the RNAV be disbanded and this was put into effect in April 1892. Despite its short period of service and lack of a role the unit is considered a predecessor of the more successful Royal Naval Volunteer Reserve, an officer-only reserve unit founded in 1903. The RNVR became known as the "Wavy Navy" for its rank insignia which was similar to that of the RNAV.
