= German submarine U-335 =

German World War II submarine

Coordinates: 62°48′N 0°12′W

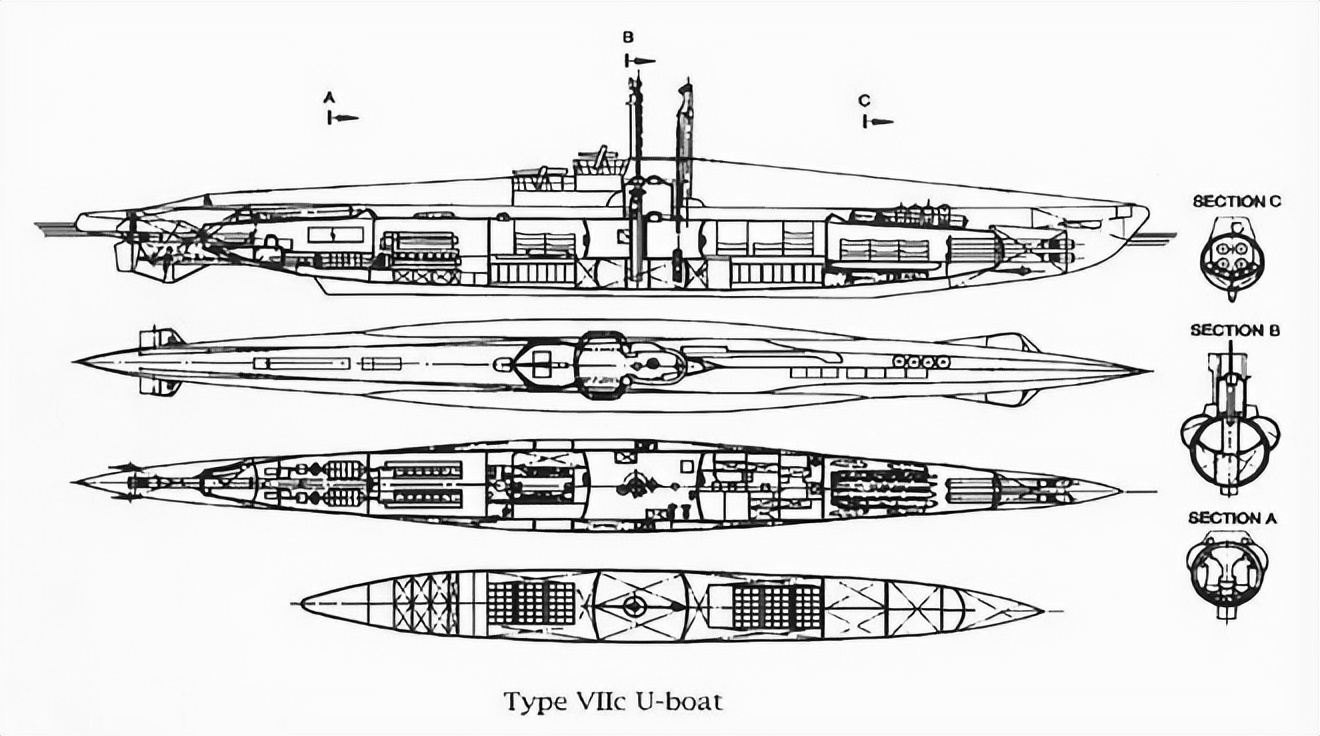
- Cross-section of a Type VIIC U-boat.

History

Nazi Germany
- Name: U-335
- Ordered: 15 August 1940
- Builder: Nordseewerke, Emden
- Yard number: 207
- Laid down: 3 January 1941
- Launched: 15 October 1941
- Commissioned: 17 December 1941
- Fate: Sunk on 3 August 1942

General characteristics
- Class & type: Type VIIC submarine
- Displacement: 769 tonnes (757 long tons) surfaced; 871 t (857 long tons) submerged
- Length: 67.10 m (220 ft 2 in) o/a; 50.50 m (165 ft 8 in) pressure hull
- Beam: 6.20 m (20 ft 4 in) o/a; 4.70 m (15 ft 5 in) pressure hull
- Height: 9.60 m (31 ft 6 in)
- Draught: 4.74 m (15 ft 7 in)
- Installed power: 2,800–3,200 PS (2,100–2,400 kW; 2,800–3,200 bhp) (diesels); 750 PS (550 kW; 740 shp) (electric)
- Propulsion: 2 shafts; 2 × diesel engines; 2 × electric motors
- Speed: 17.7 knots (32.8 km/h; 20.4 mph) surfaced; 7.6 knots (14.1 km/h; 8.7 mph) submerged
- Range: 8,500 nmi (15,700 km; 9,800 mi) at 10 knots (19 km/h; 12 mph) surfaced; 80 nmi (150 km; 92 mi) at 4 knots (7.4 km/h; 4.6 mph) submerged
- Test depth: 230 m (750 ft); Crush depth: 250–295 m (820–968 ft)
- Complement: 4 officers, 40–56 enlisted
- Armament: 5 × 53.3 cm (21 in) torpedo tubes (four bow, one stern); 14 × torpedoes or 26 TMA mines; 1 × 8.8 cm (3.46 in) deck gun (220 rounds); 1 x 2 cm (0.79 in) C/30 AA gun

Service record
- Part of: 8th U-boat Flotilla; 17 December 1941 – 31 July 1942; 6th U-boat Flotilla; 1 – 3 August 1942
- Identification codes: M 47 884
- Commanders: Kptlt. Hans-Herman Pelkner; 12 December 1941 – 3 August 1942
- Operations: 1 patrol: 30 July – 3 August 1942
- Victories: None

German submarine U-335 was a Type VIIC U-boat of Nazi Germany's Kriegsmarine during World War II. The submarine was laid down on 3 January 1941 at the Nordseewerke yard at Emden as yard number 207, launched on 15 October and commissioned on 17 December. After training between December 1941 and July 1942, U-335 departed Kiel harbour to conduct a war patrol in the Atlantic Ocean on 30 July 1942. However, after only three days, she was torpedoed and sunk by a British submarine and lost with only one survivor.

== Design and description ==
German Type VIIC submarines were preceded by the shorter Type VIIB submarines. Type VIIC U-boats had a displacement of 769 tonnes (757 long tons) on the surface and 871 tonnes (857 long tons) while submerged. U-301 had a total length of 67.10 m (220 ft 2 in), a pressure hull length of 50.50 m (165 ft 8 in), a beam of 6.20 m (20 ft 4 in), a height of 9.60 m (31 ft 6 in), and a draught of 4.74 m (15 ft 7 in). U-301's power was produced by two Germaniawerft F46 six-cylinder, four-stroke supercharged diesel engines producing a total of 2,800 to 3,200 metric horsepower (2,060 to 2,350 kW; 2,760 to 3,160 shp) for use while surfaced, and two Garbe, Lahmeyer & Co. RP 137/c double-acting electric motors producing 750 metric horsepower (550 kW; 740 shp) total for use while submerged. The submarine had two shafts and two 1.23 m (4 ft) propellers. U-301 could submerge to up to 230 metres (750 ft) underwater.

U-301 had a maximum speed of 17.7 knots (32.8 km/h; 20.4 mph) while surfaced and a maximum speed of 7.6 knots (14.1 km/h; 8.7 mph) when submerged. The submarine had a range of 80 nautical miles (150 km; 92 mi) at 4 knots (7.4 km/h; 4.6 mph) while underwater; on the surface, she could travel 8,500 nautical miles (15,700 km; 9,800 mi) at 10 knots (19 km/h; 12 mph). U-301 was fitted with five 53.3 cm (21 in) torpedo tubes (four in the bow and one in the stern), fourteen torpedoes or 26 TMA mines, one 8.8 cm (3.46 in) SK C/35 naval gun with 220 rounds, and a 2 cm (0.79 in) C/30 anti-aircraft gun. The submarine had a complement of between 44 and 60 men.

== Construction and career ==
Ordered on 15 August 1940, U-335 was laid down on 3 January 1941 at the Nordseewerke yard at Emden as yard number 207, launched on 15 October and commissioned on 17 December under the command of Kapitänleutnant Hans-Herman Pilkner.

Between 17 December 1941 and 29 July 1942, U-335 conducted training with the 8th U-boat Flotilla. At the end of her training period, U-335 was assigned to join the 6th U-boat Flotilla, based in St.Nazaire, France. The boat's one and only patrol began with her departure from Kiel on 30 July 1942. Atlantic-bound, she was torpedoed and sunk by the British submarine HMS Saracen southeast of the Faroe Islands on 3 August. Forty-three men died; there was one survivor.

== Bibliography ==
- Busch, Rainer; Röll, Hans-Joachim (1999). German U-boat commanders of World War II : a biographical dictionary. Translated by Brooks, Geoffrey. London, Annapolis, Md: Greenhill Books, Naval Institute Press. ISBN 1-55750-186-6.
- Busch, Rainer; Röll, Hans-Joachim (1999). Der U-Boot-Krieg, 1939-1945: Deutsche U-Boot-Verluste von September 1939 bis Mai 1945 [German U-boat losses from September 1939 to May 1945] (in German). Vol. IV. Hamburg, Berlin, Bonn: Mittler. ISBN 3-8132-0514-2.
- Gröner, Erich; Jung, Dieter; Maass, Martin (1991). U-boats and Mine Warfare Vessels. German Warships 1815–1945. Vol. 2. Translated by Thomas, Keith; Magowan, Rachel. London: Conway Maritime Press. ISBN 0-85177-593-4.
- Kemp, Paul (1999). U-Boats Destroyed – German Submarine Losses in the World Wars. London: Arms & Armour. ISBN 1-85409-515-3.
