= USS S-24 =

S-class submarine of the United States

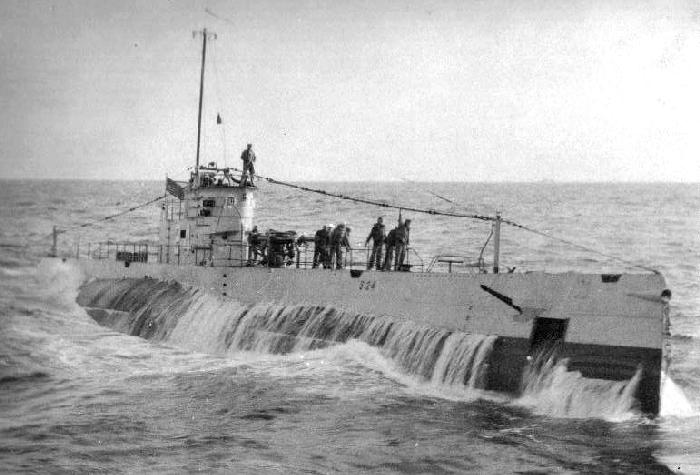
- USS S-24 (SS-129) in heavy seas, c. 1920s

History

United States
- Name: S-24
- Builder: Fore River Shipyard, Quincy, Massachusetts
- Cost: $677,622.76 (hull and machinery)
- Laid down: 1 November 1918
- Launched: 27 June 1922
- Sponsored by: Mrs. Eleanor Loper
- Commissioned: 24 August 1923
- Decommissioned: 10 August 1942
- Identification: Hull symbol: SS-129; Call sign: NINN
- Fate: Transferred to United Kingdom, 10 August 1942

United Kingdom
- Name: P555
- Acquired: 10 August 1942
- Commissioned: October 1942
- Decommissioned: May 1944
- Fate: Returned to US Navy, December 1944; Scuttled, 25 August 1947

General characteristics
- Class & type: S-18-class submarine
- Displacement: 930 long tons (945 t) surfaced; 1,094 long tons (1,112 t) submerged
- Length: 219 feet 3 inches (66.83 m)
- Beam: 20 ft 8 in (6.30 m)
- Draft: 17 ft 3 in (5.26 m)
- Installed power: 1,200 brake horsepower (895 kW) diesel; 2,375 hp (1,771 kW) electric
- Propulsion: 2 × NELSECO diesel engines; 2 × Ridgway Dynamo & Engine Company electric motors; 2 × 60-cell batteries; 2 × Propellers
- Speed: 14.5 knots (26.9 km/h; 16.7 mph) surfaced; 11 kn (20 km/h; 13 mph) submerged
- Range: 3,420 nmi (6,330 km; 3,940 mi) at 6.5 kn (12.0 km/h; 7.5 mph) surfaced; 8,950 nmi (16,580 km; 10,300 mi) at 9.5 kn (17.6 km/h; 10.9 mph) surfaced with fuel in main ballast tanks; 20 hours at 5 knots (9 km/h; 6 mph) submerged
- Test depth: 200 ft (61 m)
- Capacity: 41,921 US gallons (158,690 L; 34,907 imp gal) fuel oil
- Complement: 4 officers; 34 enlisted
- Armament: 4 × 21-inch (533 mm) torpedo tubes (12 torpedoes); 1 × 4-inch (102 mm)/50-caliber

USS S-24 (SS-129) was an S-18-class submarine, also referred to as an S-1-class or "Holland"-type, of the United States Navy. During World War II, she was transferred to the Royal Navy as P.555.

== Design ==
The S-18-class had a length of 219 feet 3 inches (66.8 m) overall, a beam of 20 ft 8 in (6.3 m), and a mean draft of 17 ft 3 in (5.3 m). They displaced 930 long tons (940 t) on the surface and 1,094 long tons (1,112 t) submerged. All S-class submarines had a crew of 4 officers and 34 enlisted men, when first commissioned. They had a diving depth of 200 ft (61.0 m).

For surface running, the S-18-class were powered by two 600-brake-horsepower (447 kW) NELSECO diesel engines, each driving one propeller shaft. When submerged each propeller was driven by a 1,175-horsepower (876 kW) Ridgway Dynamo & Engine Company electric motor. They could reach 14.5 knots (26.9 km/h; 16.7 mph) on the surface and 11 kn (20 km/h; 13 mph) underwater.

The boats were armed with four 21-inch (533 mm) torpedo tubes in the bow. They carried eight reloads, for a total of twelve torpedoes. The S-18-class submarines were also armed with a single 4 in (100 mm)/50 caliber deck gun.

== Construction ==
S-24's keel was laid down on 1 November 1918, by the Bethlehem Shipbuilding Corporation's Fore River Shipyard, in Quincy, Massachusetts. She was launched on 27 June 1922, sponsored by Mrs. Eleanor Loper, niece of Rear admiral Herbert O. Dunn, and commissioned on 24 August 1923, with future Admiral, Lieutenant commander Louis E. Denfeld in command.

== Service history ==
=== 1923–1941 ===
Operating from New London, Connecticut, in 1923 and 1924, S-24 served at Saint Thomas, US Virgin Islands, in February 1924. She visited Trinidad, from 6 to 13 March, the Panama Canal area, in April of that year and the Territory of Hawaii, from 27 April to May 1925. In addition to service in the Panama Canal area, in February and March 1926 and again in February 1929, S-24, visited Hawaii in 1927 and 1928, and twice in 1929.

Next, into 1930, she served principally at San Diego, San Pedro, and Mare Island. Sailing from San Diego, on 1 December 1930, she arrived at Pearl Harbor, on 12 Decembre. From then into 1938, S-24 operated at Pearl Harbor. Departing from Pearl Harbor, on 15 October, she returned to New London, on 4 January 1939.

After serving with a partial crew at New London, from 1 April of that year, S-24 resumed full duty on 1 July 1940. Following duty out of New London, during that year and into 1941, S-24 served next in waters near the Panama Canal, from late December into May 1942.

=== World War II ===
S-24 returned to New London, on 21 May 1942, where she was decommissioned on 10 August 1942, and transferred to the United Kingdom, for service in the Royal Navy, as HMS P.555.

=== Royal Navy ===
When P.555 arrived in UK, in October 1942, she was assigned to the 7th Submarine Flotilla, a flotilla based out of Holy Loch, Scotland. She was used for training new submarine officers and crews, and surface warships, in anti-submarine warfare. Among the officers who commanded her was Royal Naval Volunteer Reserve (RNVR) Lieutenant Edward Preston Young, making P.555 the first Royal Navy submarine to be commanded by a British RNVR officer. The Royal Navy decommissioned P.555 in May 1944, and returned her to the US Navy in December 1944.

== Fate ==
After her return, the US Navy struck S-24 from the Navy List. She was scuttled in the English Channel, off Portland Bill, on 28 April 1947, for use as a sonar target, or 25 August 1947.

Wreck site: 50°30.87′N 2°33.43′W

== Awards ==
- American Defense Service Medal
- American Campaign Medal
- World War II Victory Medal

== Bibliography ==
- "Table 21 - Ships on Navy List June 30, 1919". Congressional Serial Set. U.S. Government Printing Office: 770. 1921.
- Friedman, Norman (1995). U.S. Submarines Through 1945: An Illustrated Design History. Annapolis, Maryland: Naval Institute Press. ISBN 1-55750-263-3.
- Priolo, Gary. "S-24 (SS-129)". Navsource.net.
- "S-24". Dictionary of American Naval Fighting Ships. Navy Department, Naval History and Heritage Command. 1 September 2015. This article incorporates text from this source, which is in the public domain.
- Hall, Anne Martin (1925). Ships of the United States navy and their sponsors, 1913-1923.
- van der Dat, Dan (4 February 2003). "Edward Young (obituary)". The Guardian. London.
- Helgason, Guðmundur. "HMS P 555 (P 555)". uboat.net.
