= Mali Kyun =

Island in the Mergui Archipelago, Myanmar

Coordinates: 13°06′N 98°16′E

Location of Mali Kyun in Burma

Mali Kyun (Tavoy Island) is an island in the Mergui Archipelago, Myanmar. This long and narrow island at the northern end of the archipelago occupies an area of 99 km^{2} (38 sq mi), stretching roughly from north to south. The Myanmar Navy has an important naval base on the island.

== See also ==
- List of islands of Burma
