= Royal Naval Coast Volunteers =

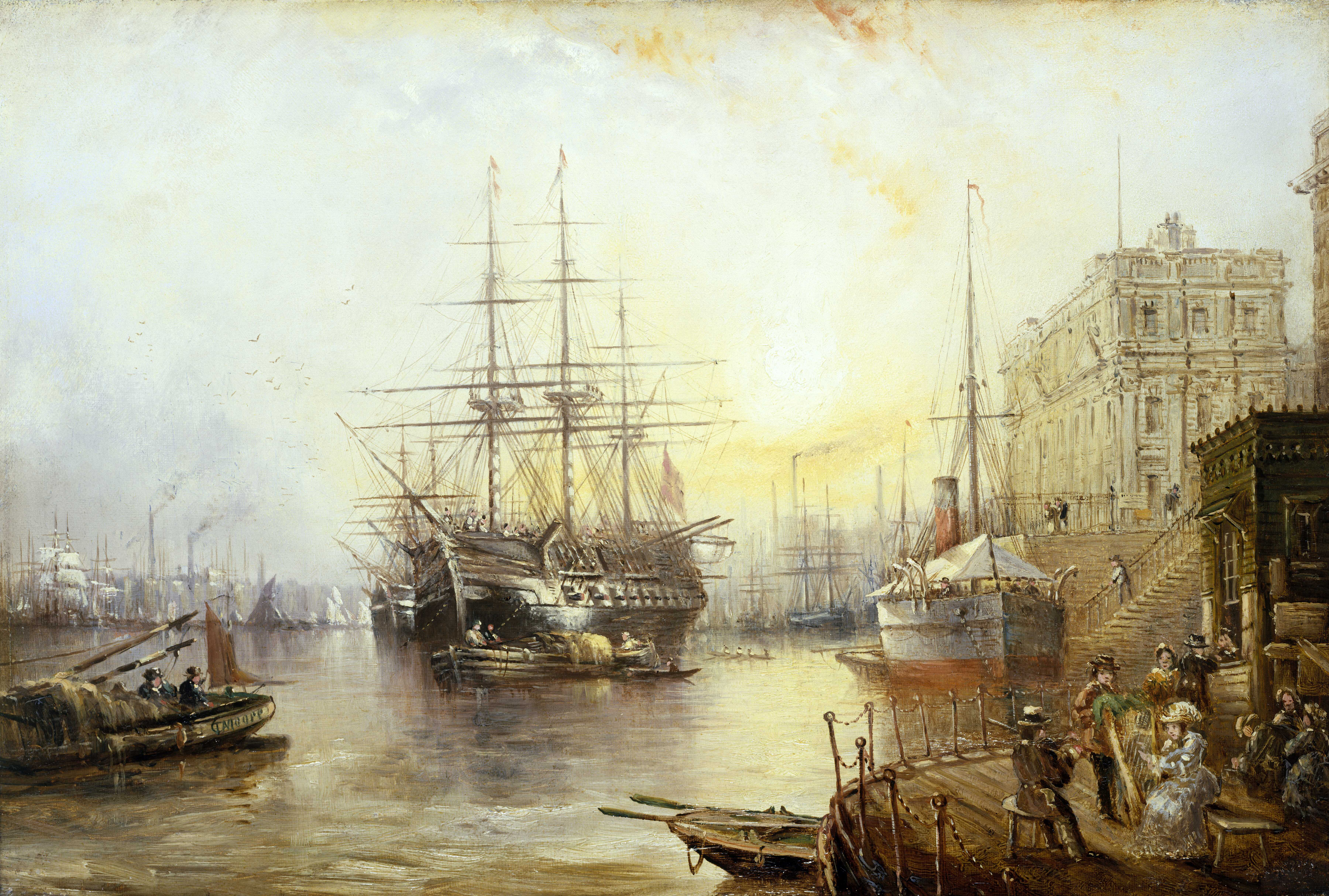
HMS Fisgard (seen in the middle of the image) was the headquarters of the RNCV at Woolwich.

The Royal Naval Coast Volunteers (RNCV) was a 19th century reserve force of the British Royal Navy. The volunteers were established in 1853 and the force lasted until 1873 when it was disbanded, with some of its volunteers entering the Royal Naval Reserve.

== Background ==
In 1852 a Royal Navy commission concluded that the navy needed a new reserve of men who could be mobilised into the navy in times of need. In response the government passed the Naval Coast Volunteers Act 1853 which allowed the Admiralty to recruit, as volunteers, up to 10,000 men who could be called up as needed.

== Terms ==
Recruitment into the RNCV was limited to "seafaring men or others "deemed suitable for the service in which such volunteers may be engaged". Volunteers enlisted for five years, were exempt from enlistment into the navy or militia and could not be called upon to serve more than 150 miles from the British coast (300 miles in times of war). In return each volunteer had to undertake 28 days training per year under the supervision of the Coastguard. When training and if called up they were to receive the pay and allowances as if they were navy Able seamen.

For peacetime service, volunteers received a bounty of £6 paid in instalments from the date of enrolment and every year of service thereafter.

== History ==
While established in 1853, organisation of the RNCV began on 1 January 1854 with the commissioning of new officers. The headquarters were located on HMS Fisgard, a depot ship in Woolwich. The RNCV was administered through six district 'out-stations' in England, Wales and Scotland. At its peak, the force comprised over 6,800 men.

Some RNCV members were called up into the navy and served during the Crimean War in the Baltic fleet. In 1856 control of the RNCV was transferred from the Coastguard to the Admiralty and the provision of training ships at various ports around the United Kingdom gave increased opportunity for gunnery training. Despite these changes an 1858 Royal Commission commented that RNCV men "were not seamen in the true acceptation of the word, but boatmen, fishermen and longshoremen" and criticised their training limitations as not including working with sails aloft. The report also criticised the geographical limits on service. The Royal Commission had two outcomes that affected the RNCV. In 1859 the Royal Naval Reserve (Volunteer) Act gave the navy the power to establish a reserve force of trained seamen, and in 1863 the geographical limit on RNCV service was abolished for new recruits.

The establishment of a Royal Naval Reserve formed from professional seamen robbed the RNCV of purpose and in 1873 it was disbanded with remaining volunteers passing into a successor reserve body the Royal Naval Artillery Volunteers.

== Districts ==
The Royal Naval Coast Volunteers were organised in January 1854 as follows:

District No.	Region	Area of Operations	Inspecting Commander	Manpower quota
1	South and South-West England	Gosport–Weston-Super-Mare	Captain William Sherringham	2,000
2	South and South-East England	Portsmouth–Great Yarmouth	Captain Peter Fisher	2,000
3	North-East England	Great Yarmouth–Berwick	Captain Henry Broadhead	1,750
4	Wales and North-West England	Weston-Super-Mare–Solway Firth	Captain James Baker	1,750
5	Scotland	Berwick–Inverness	Captain Robert Craigie (1854); Captain John Fraser (1855–6)	1,500
6	Ireland	Cork–Galway	Captain Arthur Jerningham	1,000
