= HMS Carnarvon =

Royal Navy warship built in 1905

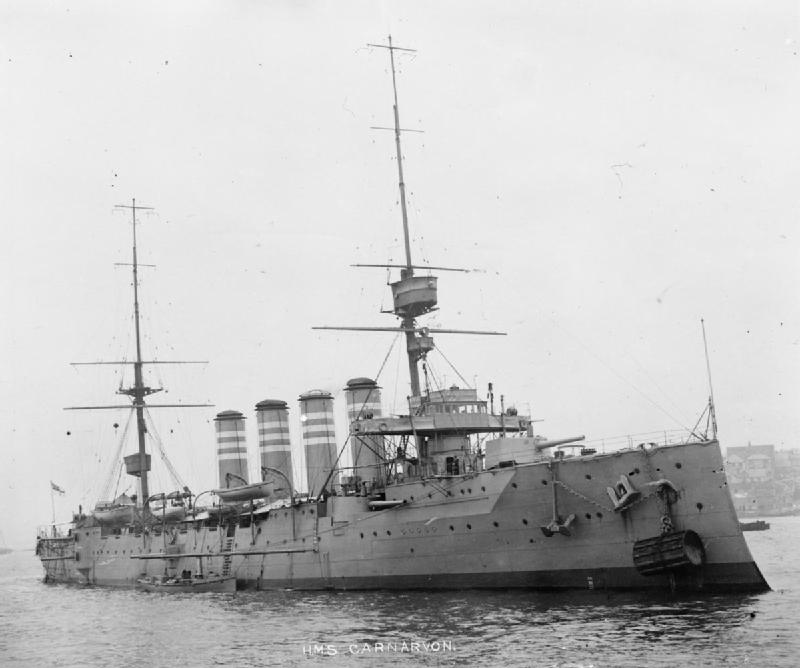
- Carnarvon at anchor

History

United Kingdom
- Name: HMS Carnarvon
- Namesake: Caernarfonshire
- Builder: William Beardmore & Company, Dalmuir
- Laid down: 1 October 1902
- Launched: 7 October 1903
- Completed: 29 May 1905
- Fate: Sold for scrap, 8 November 1921

General characteristics
- Class & type: Devonshire-class armoured cruiser
- Displacement: 10,850 long tons (11,020 t) (normal)
- Length: 473 ft 6 in (144.3 m) (o/a)
- Beam: 68 ft 6 in (20.9 m)
- Draught: 24 ft (7.3 m)
- Installed power: 21,000 ihp (16,000 kW); 17 Niclausse boilers; 6 cylindrical boilers
- Propulsion: 2 × Shafts; 2 × Humphrys, Tennant and Co. 4-cylinder triple-expansion steam engines
- Speed: 22 knots (41 km/h; 25 mph)
- Complement: 610
- Armament: 4 × single BL 7.5-inch Mk I guns; 6 × single BL 6-inch Mk VII guns; 2 × single 12-pounder 8 cwt guns (Note: "Cwt" is the abbreviation for hundredweight, 12 cwt referring to the weight of the gun.); 18 × single QF 3-pounder Hotchkiss guns; 2 × single 18-inch torpedo tubes
- Armour: Belt: 2–6 in (51–152 mm); Decks: .75–2 in (19–51 mm); Barbettes: 6 in (152 mm); Turrets: 5 in (130 mm); Conning tower: 12 in (305 mm); Bulkheads: 5 in (127 mm)

HMS Carnarvon was one of six Devonshire-class armoured cruisers built for the Royal Navy in the first decade of the 20th century. She was assigned to the 3rd Cruiser Squadron of the Mediterranean Fleet upon completion in 1905 and was transferred to the 2nd Cruiser Squadron of the Atlantic Fleet in 1907. She was assigned to the reserve Third Fleet in 1909 and became flagship of the 5th Cruiser Squadron of the reserve Second Fleet in 1912.

When World War I began in August 1914, she was assigned to the Cape Verde Station to search for German commerce raiders while protecting British shipping. Carnarvon was transferred to the South Atlantic two months later and assigned to the squadron that destroyed the German East Asia Squadron at the Battle of the Falklands. She was assigned to the North America and West Indies Station in 1915 and continued to patrol against German raiders and escort convoys to the end of the war. In 1919, she became a training ship and was then sold for scrap in 1921.

== Design and description ==
Carnarvon was designed to displace 10,850 long tons (11,020 t). The ship had an overall length of 473 feet 6 inches (144.3 m), a beam of 68 feet 6 inches (20.9 m) and a deep draught of 24 feet (7.3 m). She was powered by two 4-cylinder triple-expansion steam engines, each driving one shaft, which produced a total of 21,000 indicated horsepower (16,000 kW) and gave a maximum speed of 22 knots (41 km/h; 25 mph). The engines were powered by seventeen Niclausse and six cylindrical boilers. She carried a maximum of 1,033 long tons (1,050 t) of coal and her complement consisted of 610 officers and ratings.

Her main armament consisted of four breech-loading (BL) 7.5-inch Mk I guns mounted in four single-gun turrets, one each fore and aft of the superstructure and one on each side. The guns fired their 200-pound (91 kg) shells to a range of about 13,800 yards (12,600 m). Her secondary armament of six BL 6-inch Mk VII guns was arranged in casemates amidships. Four of these were mounted on the main deck and were only usable in calm weather. They had a maximum range of approximately 12,200 yards (11,200 m) with their 100-pound (45 kg) shells. Carnarvon also carried eighteen quick-firing (QF) 3-pounder Hotchkiss guns and two submerged 18-inch torpedo tubes. Her two 12-pounder 8 cwt guns could be dismounted for service ashore.

At some point in the war, the main deck six-inch guns of the Devonshire-class ships were moved to the upper deck and given gun shields. Their casemates were plated over to improve seakeeping and the four 3-pounder guns displaced by the transfer were landed.

The ship's waterline armour belt ranged from two to six inches (51 to 152 mm) in thickness and was closed off by five-inch (127 mm) transverse bulkheads. The armour of the gun turrets was also five inches thick whilst that of their barbettes was six inches thick. The protective deck armour ranged in thickness from .75–2 inches (19–51 mm) and the conning tower was protected by twelve inches (305 mm) of armour.

== Construction and service ==
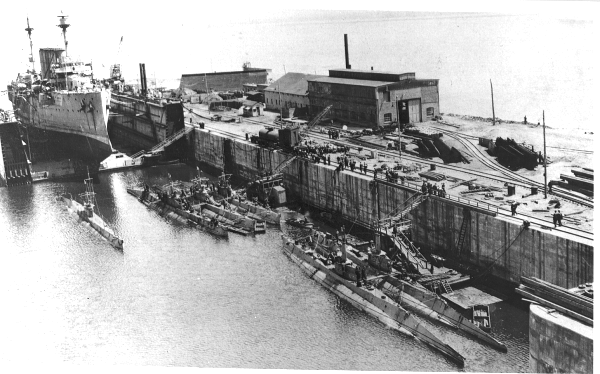
The drydocked Carnarvon (at upper left) with the British submarines H5, H6, H7, H8, H9, and H10 in 1915

Carnarvon, named to commemorate the Welsh county, was laid down by William Beardmore & Company at their Dalmuir shipyard on 1 October 1902 and launched on 7 October 1903. She was completed on 29 May 1905 and was initially assigned to the 3rd Cruiser Squadron of the Mediterranean Fleet. She was transferred to the 2nd Cruiser Squadron of the Atlantic Fleet in June 1907 and was then assigned to the reserve Third Fleet at Devonport in April 1909. The ship was transferred to the Second Fleet at Devonport in March 1912 and subsequently became the flagship of the 5th Cruiser Squadron until the start of World War I. She participated in the fleet manoeuvres in July–August 1913 as well as those in July 1914. On 31 July, a few days before war was declared on Germany, she encountered the German light cruiser Strassburg in the English Channel returning home and the two ships saluted each other.

When news of the outbreak of hostilities was received on 5 August, Carnarvon, now the flagship of Rear Admiral Archibald Stoddart, was at sea, making for the Canary Islands from Gibraltar. She was quickly sent to Cape Verde and captured the German merchant ship SS Professor Woermann on 23 August 1914. She escorted her prize to Freetown, Sierra Leone for disposal and resumed patrolling. She moved to the Brazilian coast in October and then proceeded to the Falkland Islands with the squadron commanded by Vice-Admiral Doveton Sturdee.

=== Battle of the Falklands ===
Upon arrival at Port Stanley on 7 December, Sturdee informed his captains that he planned to recoal the entire squadron the following day from the two available colliers and to begin the search for the East Asia Squadron, believed to be running for home around the tip of South America, the day after. Vice-Admiral Maximilian von Spee, commander of the German squadron, had other plans and intended to destroy the radio station at Port Stanley on the morning of 8 December. The appearance of two German ships at 07:30 caught Sturdee's ships by surprise, but the Germans were driven off by 12-inch (300 mm) shells fired by the predreadnought battleship Canopus when they came within range around 09:20. Carnarvon completed recoaling at 08:00 and the squadron cleared the harbour by 10:30. Sturdee ordered "general chase" at that time, but Carnarvon could only manage 18 knots (33 km/h; 21 mph) and fell behind the other British ships. His two battlecruisers were the fastest ships present and inexorably began to close on the German cruisers, opening fire at 12:55 that straddled the light cruiser Leipzig, the rear ship in the German formation. It was clear to Spee that his ships could not outrun the battlecruisers and that the only hope for any of his ships to survive was to scatter. So he turned his two armoured cruisers around to buy time by engaging the battlecruisers and ordered his three light cruisers to disperse at 13:20. Carnarvon, now 10 nautical miles (19 km; 12 mi) behind, had no hope of catching the scattering German ships and continued to trail the battlecruisers.

Carnarvon finally came within range of the German armoured cruisers and opened fire shortly before Scharnhorst rolled over and capsized at 16:17. She then engaged Gneisenau until Sturdee ordered "cease fire" at 17:50. The German captain had started to scuttle his ship 10 minutes earlier when it was clear that the situation was hopeless and his ship sank at 18:00. Carnarvon rescued 20 survivors from Gneisenau, but only wreckage was visible when she later steamed through the area where Scharnhorst had sunk.

After the battle she participated in the hunt for the light cruiser Dresden that had escaped during the battle and investigated anchorages in Argentina, Chile and the island of South Georgia before proceeding north to Brazil in February. She struck a coral reef off the Abrolhos Archipelago on 22 February 1915 and had to be beached to avoid sinking. The ship received temporary repairs at Rio de Janeiro the following month. Carnarvon received permanent repairs in Montreal, Canada, from May to July after which she escorted several British H-class submarines from Halifax to the United Kingdom en route to Devonport. She then returned to Halifax where she was based for the rest of the year. Now assigned to the North America and West Indies Station, with its main base at the Royal Naval Dockyard in the Imperial fortress colony of Bermuda, she resumed her duties protecting British shipping for the rest of the war. After the United States Navy destroyer USS Stewart grounded at Bermuda on 16 August 1917, a cricket team from Carnarvon played a match against one from Stewart at the Bermuda dockyard. In 1919, she began serving as a cadet training ship, remaining in that role until she was listed for sale in March 1921. Carnarvon was sold for scrap on 8 November 1921 and subsequently broken up in Germany.

== Bibliography ==
- Chesneau, Roger & Kolesnik, Eugene M., eds. (1979). Conway's All the World's Fighting Ships 1860–1905. Greenwich: Conway Maritime Press. ISBN 0-8317-0302-4.
- Dodson, Aidan (2026). "The Cadet Training Ships of the Royal Navy". In Jordan, John (ed.). Warship 2026. Osprey Publishing. pp. 156–174. ISBN 978-1-4728-7259-3.
- Friedman, Norman (2012). British Cruisers of the Victorian Era. Barnsley, South Yorkshire, UK: Seaforth. ISBN 978-1-59114-068-9.
- Friedman, Norman (2011). Naval Weapons of World War One. Barnsley, South Yorkshire, UK: Seaforth. ISBN 978-1-84832-100-7.
- Gardiner, Robert & Gray, Randal, eds. (1985). Conway's All the World's Fighting Ships 1906–1921. Annapolis, Maryland: Naval Institute Press. ISBN 0-85177-245-5.
- Massie, Robert K. (2003). Castles of Steel: Britain, Germany, and the Winning of the Great War at Sea. New York: Random House. ISBN 0-679-45671-6.
- Silverstone, Paul H. (1984). Directory of the World's Capital Ships. New York: Hippocrene Books. ISBN 0-88254-979-0.
- "Transcript: HMS CARNARVON – July 1913 to December 1915, British Waters, Central and South Atlantic, Battle of the Falklands, North Atlantic (Part 1 of 2)". Royal Navy Log Books of the World War 1 Era. Naval-History.net.
