= HMS H34 =

Submarine of the Royal Navy

History

United Kingdom
- Name: HMS H34
- Builder: Cammell Laird, Birkenhead
- Laid down: 20 November 1917
- Launched: 5 November 1918
- Commissioned: 10 September 1919
- Fate: Sold for scrapping, July 1945

General characteristics
- Class & type: H-class submarine
- Displacement: 423 long tons (430 t) surfaced; 510 long tons (518 t) submerged
- Length: 171 ft 0 in (52.12 m)
- Beam: 15 ft 4 in (4.67 m)
- Propulsion: 1 × 480 hp (358 kW) diesel engine; 2 × 620 hp (462 kW) electric motors
- Speed: 11.5 knots (21.3 km/h; 13.2 mph) surfaced; 9 knots (17 km/h; 10 mph) submerged
- Range: 2,985 nmi (5,528 km) at 7.5 kn (13.9 km/h; 8.6 mph) surfaced; 130 nmi (240 km) at 2 kn (3.7 km/h; 2.3 mph) submerged
- Complement: 22
- Armament: 4 × 21 in (533 mm) bow torpedo tubes; 8 × 21-inch torpedoes

HMS H34 was a British H-class submarine built by Cammell Laird, Birkenhead. The vessel was laid down on 20 November 1917 and was commissioned on 10 September 1919. She had a complement of twenty-two crew members. H34 was one of the seven H-class submarines to survive until the end of World War II. During Warship Week 1942 H34 was adopted by West Dean RD Council, in the Forest of Dean. She was sold for scrapping in Troon in July 1945.

== Design ==
Like all post-H20 British H-class submarines, H34 had a displacement of 423 long tons (430 t) at the surface and 510 long tons (520 t) while submerged. It had a total length of 171 feet (52 m), a beam of 15 feet 4 inches (4.67 m), and a draught of 12 metres (39 ft). It contained a diesel engines providing a total power of 480 horsepower (360 kW) and two electric motors each providing 320 horsepower (240 kW) power. The use of its electric motors made the submarine travel at 11 knots (20 km/h; 13 mph). It would normally carry 16.4 long tons (16.7 t) of fuel and had a maximum capacity of 18 long tons (18 t).

The submarine had a maximum surface speed of 13 knots (24 km/h; 15 mph) and a submerged speed of 10.5 knots (19.4 km/h; 12.1 mph). Post-H20 British H-class submarines had ranges of 2,985 nautical miles (5,528 km; 3,435 mi) at speeds of 7.5 knots (13.9 km/h; 8.6 mph) when surfaced. H34 was fitted with an anti-aircraft gun and four 21-inch (533 mm) torpedo tubes. Its torpedo tubes were fitted to the bow and the submarine was loaded with eight 21-inch (533 mm) torpedoes. She was a Holland 602 type submarine but was designed to meet Royal Navy specifications. The complement was twenty-two crew members.

== See also ==
- List of submarines of the Second World War

== Bibliography ==
- Hutchinson, Robert (2001). Jane's submarines : war beneath the waves from 1776 to the present day. London: HarperCollins. ISBN 9780007105588.
