= H23 =

H23 or H-23 may refer to:

- H-23 Raven, a 1948 American three-place, light observation helicopter
- HMS H23, a 1918 British Royal Navy submarine which saw service during World War I
- HMS Echo (H23), a 1934 British Royal Navy destroyer which saw service during World War II
