= H25 =

H25 or H-25 may refer to:

- Piasecki H-25, a helicopter formerly operated by the Canadian, French and United States militaries
- HMS H25, a United Kingdom Royal Navy submarine which saw service during World War I

and also :

- H25, a medium-format camera made by Danish company Phase One as part of their H-series line
- Senile cataract ICD-10 code
