= HH9 =

HH9 or HH-9 may refer to:

- Ashes of Victory, the ninth novel in the Honor Harrington series by David Weber, abbreviated HH9
- HH9, an album by Henrik Nordvargr Björkk; see Nordvargr discography
- HH9, one of the Hamburger–Hamilton stages in chick development
- HH9, one of the hammerhead ribozymes
- Nasal embryonic LHRH factor (HH9)
- German trawler V 206 Otto Bröhan (pennant: HH9), a WWII-era German fishing boat

== See also ==
- H9 (disambiguation)
