= HMS H44 =

Submarine of the Royal Navy

- HMS H44

History

United Kingdom
- Name: HMS H44
- Builder: Armstrong Whitworth
- Launched: 17 February 1919
- Commissioned: 15 April 1920
- Fate: Sold in 1944; broken up in February 1945

General characteristics
- Class & type: H-class submarine
- Displacement: 423 long tons surfaced (510 tons submerged)
- Length: 171 ft 0 in (52.12 m)
- Beam: 15 ft 4 in (4.67 m)
- Propulsion: 480 hp (360 kW) diesel, 2 x 620 hp (460 kW) electric
- Speed: 11.5 knots (21.3 km/h; 13.2 mph) surfaced; 9 knots (17 km/h; 10 mph) submerged
- Range: 2,985 nautical miles (5,528 km; 3,435 mi) at 7.5 knots (13.9 km/h; 8.6 mph) on surface; 130 nautical miles (240 km; 150 mi) at 2 knots (3.7 km/h; 2.3 mph) submerged
- Complement: 22
- Armament: 4 × 21 in (533 mm) bow torpedo tubes; 8 × 21 inch torpedoes; QF 6-pounder gun after refitting

HMS H44 was an H-class submarine of the Royal Navy. She was built by Armstrong Whitworth and launched on 17 February 1919. She served in the Second World War. She had a complement of twenty-two crew members. She was sold in 1944 and was broken up at Troon in February 1945.

== Design ==
Like all post-H20 British H-class submarines, H44 had a displacement of 423 long tons (430 t) at the surface and 510 long tons (520 t) while submerged. It had a total length of 171 feet (52 m), a beam of 15 feet 4 inches (4.67 m), and a draught of 12 metres (39 ft). It contained a diesel engines providing a total power of 480 horsepower (360 kW) and two electric motors each providing 320 horsepower (240 kW) power. The use of its electric motors made the submarine travel at 11 knots (20 km/h; 13 mph). It would normally carry 16.4 long tons (16.7 t) of fuel and had a maximum capacity of 18 long tons (18 t).

The submarine had a maximum surface speed of 13 knots (24 km/h; 15 mph) and a submerged speed of 10.5 knots (19.4 km/h; 12.1 mph). Post-H20 British H-class submarines had ranges of 2,985 nautical miles (5,528 km; 3,435 mi) at speeds of 7.5 knots (13.9 km/h; 8.6 mph) when surfaced. H44 was fitted with an anti-aircraft gun and four 21 inches (530 mm) torpedo tubes. Its torpedo tubes were fitted to the bow and the submarine was loaded with eight 21 inches (530 mm) torpedoes. It is a Holland 602 type submarine but was designed to meet Royal Navy specifications. Its complement was twenty-two crew members.

== See also ==
- List of submarines of the Second World War

== Bibliography ==
- Colledge, J. J.; Warlow, Ben (2006) [1969]. Ships of the Royal Navy: The Complete Record of All Fighting Ships of the Royal Navy from the 15th Century to the Present (3rd Rev ed.). London: Chatham Publishing. ISBN 978-1-86176-281-8. OCLC 67375475.
