= H52 =

H52 or H-52 may refer to:

- H-52 (Michigan county highway)
- Bernard H.52, a French floatplane
- HMS H52, a Royal Navy H-class submarine
- Sikorsky HH-52 Seaguard, an American helicopter
