= H30 =

H30 or H-30 may refer to:

- H30 (Long Island bus), in Suffolk County, New York
- Dongfeng Fengshen H30, a Chinese hatchback
- HMS Beagle (H30), a Royal Navy B-class destroyer
- HMS H30, a Royal Navy H class submarine
- McCulloch H-30, an American tandem-rotor helicopter
- Nissan H30, an automobile engine

== See also ==
- Hydronium (H_{3}O^{+}), with a letter O instead of a zero
