= H51 =

H51 may refer to:

- HMS H51, a Royal Navy H-class submarine
- HMS Scout (H51), a Royal Navy S-class destroyer
- Lockheed H-51, an experimental American helicopter
