= H24 =

H24 may refer to:

- HMS H24, a 1917 British Royal Navy submarine which saw service during World War I
- HMS Hasty (H24), a 1936 British Royal Navy destroyer which saw service during World War II
- Lioré et Olivier LeO H-24, a French-manufactured flying boat used for European passenger air services in the 1930s
