= H29 =

H29 may refer to:

- Hanriot H.29
- HMS H29, a 1917 British H class submarine
- HMS Thanet (H29)
- McDonnell H-29, an experimental ramjet-rotor powered helicopter
