= HMS H50 =

Submarine of the Royal Navy

History

United Kingdom
- Name: HMS H50
- Builder: William Beardmore and Company, Dalmuir
- Laid down: 23 January 1918
- Launched: 25 October 1919
- Commissioned: 3 February 1920
- Fate: Sold for scrapping, July 1945

General characteristics
- Class & type: H-class submarine
- Displacement: 423 long tons (430 t) surfaced; 510 long tons (518 t) submerged
- Length: 171 ft 0 in (52.12 m)
- Beam: 15 ft 4 in (4.67 m)
- Propulsion: 1 × 480 hp (358 kW) diesel engine; 2 × 620 hp (462 kW) electric motors
- Speed: 11.5 knots (21.3 km/h; 13.2 mph) surfaced; 9 knots (17 km/h; 10 mph) submerged
- Range: 2,985 nmi (5,528 km) at 7.5 kn (13.9 km/h; 8.6 mph) surfaced; 130 nmi (240 km) at 2 kn (3.7 km/h; 2.3 mph) submerged
- Complement: 22
- Armament: 4 × 21 in (533 mm) bow torpedo tubes; 8 × 21 inch torpedoes

HMS H50 was a H-class submarine built by William Beardmore and Company, Dalmuir. She was laid down on 23 January 1918 and was commissioned on 3 February 1920. She had a complement of 22 crew members. H50 was one of seven H-class boats to survive to the end of World War II . She was sold for scrapping in July 1945 in Troon.

== Design ==
Like all post-H20 British H-class submarines, H50 had a displacement of 423 long tons (430 t) at the surface and 510 long tons (520 t) while submerged. It had a total length of 171 feet (52 m), a beam of 15 feet 4 inches (4.67 m), and a draught of 12 metres (39 ft). It contained a diesel engine providing a total power of 480 horsepower (360 kW) and two electric motors each providing 320 horsepower (240 kW) power. The use of its electric motors made the submarine travel at 11 knots (20 km/h; 13 mph). It would normally carry 16.4 long tons (16.7 t) of fuel and had a maximum capacity of 18 long tons (18 t).

The submarine had a maximum surface speed of 13 knots (24 km/h; 15 mph) and a submerged speed of 10.5 knots (19.4 km/h; 12.1 mph). Post-H20 British H-class submarines had ranges of 2,985 nautical miles (5,528 km; 3,435 mi) at speeds of 7.5 knots (13.9 km/h; 8.6 mph) when surfaced. H50 was fitted with an anti-aircraft gun and four 21-inch (533 mm) torpedo tubes. Its torpedo tubes were fitted to the bow and the submarine was loaded with eight 21 in (533 mm) torpedoes. It is a Holland 602 type submarine but was designed to meet Royal Navy specifications. Its complement was 22 crew members.

== See also ==
- List of submarines of the Second World War

== Bibliography ==
- Hutchinson, Robert (2001). Jane's submarines : war beneath the waves from 1776 to the present day. London: HarperCollins. ISBN 978-0007105588.
