= H42 =

H42 or H-42 may refer to:

- H-42 (Michigan county highway)
- Glaucoma
- HMS Arrow (H42), a Royal Navy A-class destroyer
- HMS H42, a Royal Navy H-class submarine
- H-42, an H-class battleship proposal for Germany's Kriegsmarine during World War II
