= H26 =

H26 may refer to:

- Hanriot H.26, a French prototype fighter aircraft
- Herreshoff H-26, an American sailboat design
- HMS H26, a 1918 British Royal Navy H class submarine
- Other cataract ICD-10 code
- H-26, in US helicopter designations was the American Helicopter XH-26 Jet Jeep
