= H48 =

H48 may refer to:

- HMCS Fraser (H48), a Royal Canadian Navy River-class destroyer
- HNoMS Sleipner (H48), a Royal Norwegian Navy Sleipner-class destroyer
- HMS H48, a Royal Navy H class submarine
