= HMS H42 =

Submarine of the Royal Navy

History

United Kingdom
- Name: HMS H42
- Builder: Armstrong Whitworth, Newcastle Upon Tyne
- Laid down: September 1917
- Launched: 21 October 1918
- Commissioned: 1 May 1919
- Fate: Sunk in collision 23 March 1922

General characteristics
- Class & type: H-class submarine
- Displacement: 423 long tons (430 t) surfaced; 510 long tons (518 t) submerged
- Length: 171 ft 0 in (52.12 m)
- Beam: 15 ft 4 in (4.67 m)
- Propulsion: 1 × 480 hp (358 kW) diesel engine; 2 × 620 hp (462 kW) electric motors
- Speed: 11.5 knots (21.3 km/h; 13.2 mph) surfaced; 9 knots (17 km/h; 10 mph) submerged
- Range: 2,985 nmi (5,528 km) at 7.5 kn (13.9 km/h; 8.6 mph) surfaced; 130 nmi (240 km) at 2 kn (3.7 km/h; 2.3 mph) submerged
- Complement: 22
- Armament: 4 × 21 in (533 mm) bow torpedo tubes; 8 × 21-inch torpedoes

HMS H42 was a British H-class submarine that sank with the loss of all 24 of its crew after an accidental collision in 1922. The sub was built by Armstrong Whitworth, Newcastle Upon Tyne. She was laid down in September 1917 and was commissioned on 1 May 1919.

On 23 March 1922, under the command of Royal Navy Lieutenant Douglas Staley, H42 was practising torpedo attacks against British destroyers steaming off Europa Point, Gibraltar, when she surfaced unexpectedly only 30 or 120 yards (27 or 110 metres) – sources differ – ahead of the destroyer HMS Versatile. Versatile, making 20 knots (37 km/h; 23 mph), went to full speed astern on her engines and put her helm over hard to port, but had not yet begun to answer her helm when she rammed H42 abaft the conning tower, almost slicing the submarine in half. H42 sank with the loss of all hands. An investigation found H42 at fault for surfacing where she did against instructions.

== Design ==
Like all post-H20 British H-class submarines, H42 had a displacement of 423 long tons (430 t) at the surface and 510 long tons (520 t) while submerged. It had a total length of 171 feet (52 m), a beam of 15 feet 4 inches (4.67 m), and a draught of 12 metres (39 ft). It contained a diesel engines providing a total power of 480 horsepower (360 kW) and two electric motors each providing 320 horsepower (240 kW) power. The use of its electric motors made the submarine travel at 11 knots (20 km/h; 13 mph). It would normally carry 16.4 long tons (16.7 t) of fuel and had a maximum capacity of 18 long tons (18 t).

The submarine had a maximum surface speed of 13 knots (24 km/h; 15 mph) and a submerged speed of 10.5 knots (19.4 km/h; 12.1 mph). Post-H20 British H-class submarines had ranges of 2,985 nautical miles (5,528 km; 3,435 mi) at speeds of 7.5 knots (13.9 km/h; 8.6 mph) when surfaced. H42 was fitted with an anti-aircraft gun and four 21-inch (533 mm) torpedo tubes. Its torpedo tubes were fitted to the bow and the submarine was loaded with eight 21-inch (533 mm) torpedoes. It is a Holland 602 type submarine but was designed to meet Royal Navy specifications. Its complement was twenty-two crew members.

== Bibliography ==
- Hutchinson, Robert (2001). Jane's submarines : war beneath the waves from 1776 to the present day. London: HarperCollins. ISBN 9780007105588.
- Richardson, Alexander and Archibald Hurd. (editors). Brassey's Naval and Shipping Annual 1923. London, William Clowes, 1923.
