= 9H =

9H or 9-H can refer to:

- 9H, IATA code for Dutch Antilles Express
- 9H, see London Buses route 9 (Heritage)
- New York State Route 9H
- N-9H, a model of Curtiss Model N
- WAG-9H, a model of Indian locomotive class WAG-9
- 9H, National aircraft registration prefix for Malta
- The highest pencil hardness grade

== See also ==
- H9 (disambiguation)
