= British H-class submarine =

Class of submarines operated by the Royal Navy

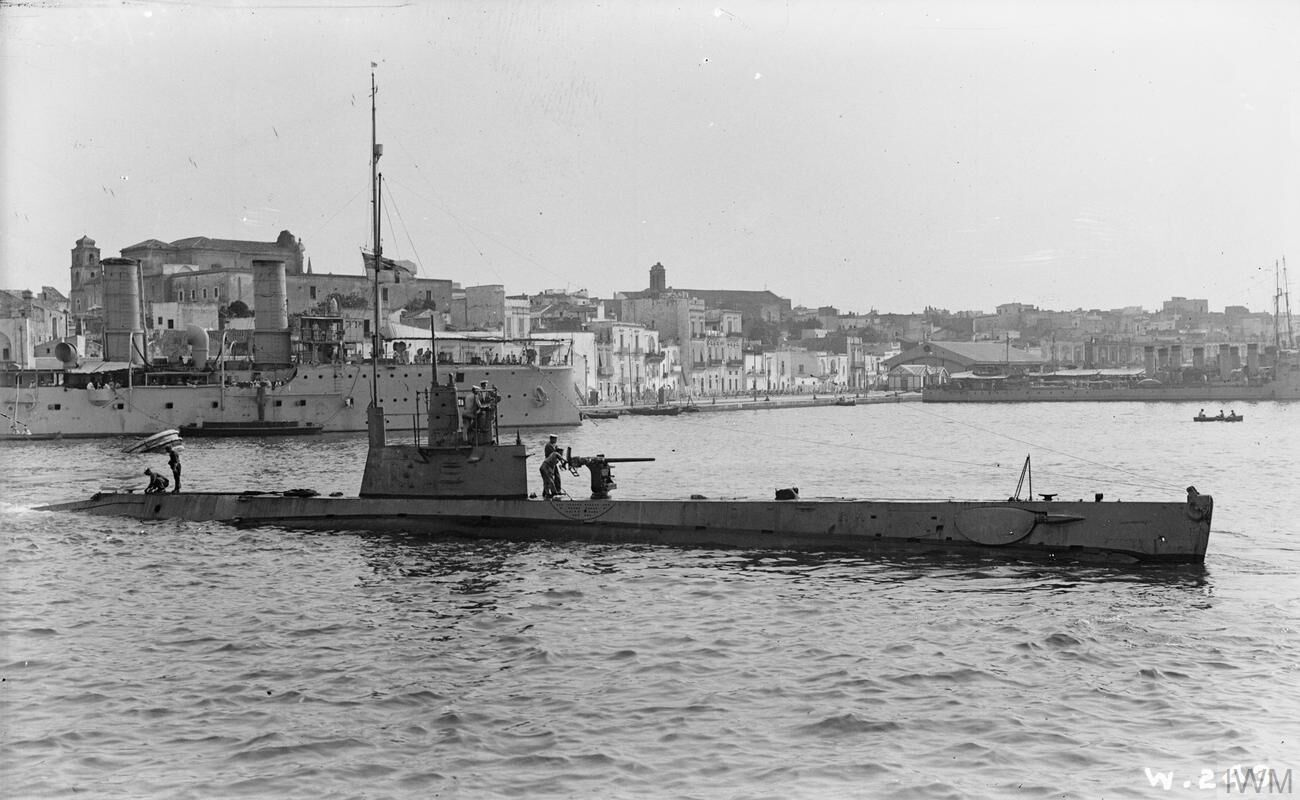
- H4 at Brindisi, August 1916

Class overview
- Operators: Royal Navy; Royal Canadian Navy; Chilean Navy; Royal Netherlands Navy; Kriegsmarine
- Preceded by: E class (UK); CC class (Canada)
- Succeeded by: J class (UK); Capitan O'Brien class (Chile); Balao class (Canada and Chile)
- In commission: 1915–1945
- Completed: 42
- Lost: 9
- Retired: 33

General characteristics
- Type: Submarine
- Displacement: Group 1+2 : 363 long tons (369 t) surfaced; 434 long tons (441 t) submerged; Group 3 : 423 long tons (430 t) surfaced; 510 long tons (518 t) submerged
- Length: Group 1+2 : 150 ft 3 in (45.80 m); Group 3 : 171 ft 0 in (52.12 m)
- Beam: 15 ft 4 in (4.67 m)
- Installed power: 2 × 240 hp (179 kW) diesel engines; 2 × 310 hp (231 kW) electric motors
- Propulsion: 2 × propeller shafts
- Speed: Group 1+2 : 13 knots (24 km/h; 15 mph) surfaced; 10 knots (19 km/h; 12 mph) submerged; Group 3 : 11.5 knots (21.3 km/h; 13.2 mph) surfaced; 9 knots (17 km/h; 10 mph) submerged
- Range: Group 1+2 : 1,600 nmi (3,000 km) at 10 kn (19 km/h; 12 mph) surfaced; Group 3 : 2,985 nmi (5,528 km) at 7.5 kn (13.9 km/h; 8.6 mph) surfaced; Group 1+2+3 : 130 nmi (240 km) at 2 kn (3.7 km/h; 2.3 mph) submerged
- Complement: 22
- Armament: 4 × 18 in (457 mm) bow torpedo tubes; 8 × 18-inch torpedoes; 1 × QF 6-pounder gun (H1–H4 only)

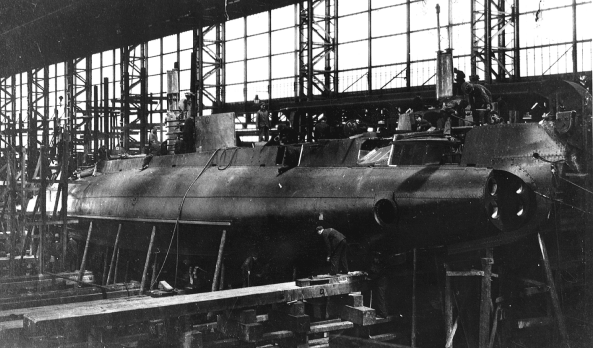
An H-class submarine under construction

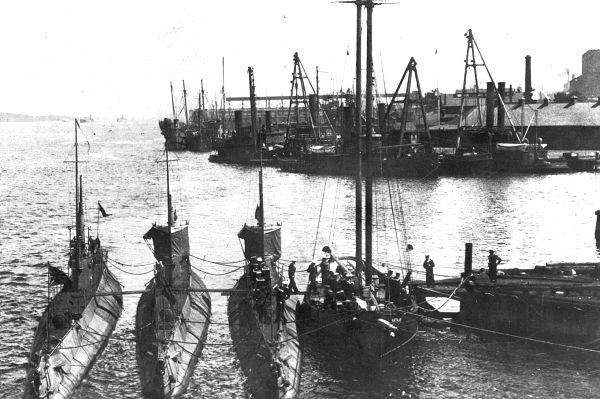
Three H-class submarines (lower left)

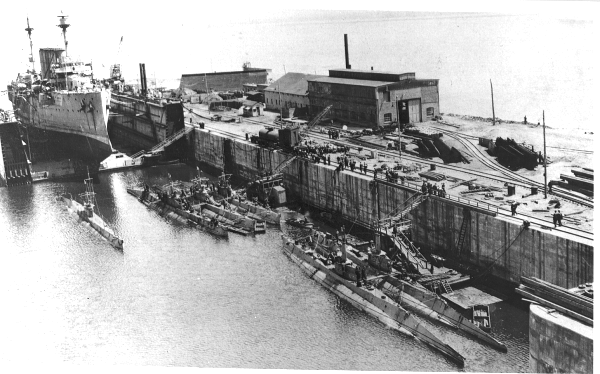
H5, H6, H7, H8, H9, and H10 with the drydocked British armoured cruiser Carnarvon (at upper left) during World War I, sometime between the 1915 commissioning of the submarines and the 4 May 1917 sale of H6 to the Netherlands

The British H-class submarines were Holland 602 type submarines used by the Royal Navy. The submarines constructed for the British Royal Navy between 1915 and 1919 were designed and built in response to German boats which mined British waters and sank coastal shipping with ease owing to their small size. The H class was created to perform similar operations in German waters, and to attack German submarines operating in British waters.

Despite their cramped size and lack of a deck gun on some submarines, the class was popular amongst submariners, and saw action all around the British Isles, some being transferred as far as the Adriatic. Owing to the late arrival of most of the class, they were unable to have much impact in service, only destroying two German submarines U-51 and UB-52 for the loss of four of their own number.

Post-war, many were retained in the Royal Navy for training purposes, while four more were lost in accidents during the 1920s. At the outbreak of the Second World War, the class was obsolete, but retained in training and coastal warfare roles to help the Royal Navy cope with heavy losses to the submarine fleet during the early stages of the war. Two were sunk in this role by German countermeasures. The boats built in Canada, but not in the United States, were equipped with Fessenden transducers.

== Boats ==
=== Group 1 ===
Group 1 was built in Canada at the Canadian Vickers Yards in Montreal before being transported across the Atlantic and deployed from Britain as British shipyards were too busy to construct submarines at this time:

- H1 – Launched 1 April 1915
- H2 – Launched 1 April 1915
- H3 – Launched 1 April 1915. Mined and sunk July 1916
- H4 – Launched 1 April 1915
- H5 – Launched 1 April 1915. Rammed and sunk March 1918
- H6 – Launched June 1915. Interned and purchased by the Dutch January 1916
- H7 – Launched June 1915
- H8 – Launched June 1915
- H9 – Launched June 1915
- H10 – Launched June 1915. Disappeared 1918

=== Group 2 ===
The second group was constructed simultaneously with the first group, but at Fore River Yard at Quincy, Massachusetts in the then-neutral United States. When the U.S. government discovered the construction, they impounded all the completed units, releasing them only following their own declaration of war two years later. To escape this difficulty, the British government gave six units to the Chilean Navy as partial payment for the appropriation of six Chilean ships for British service in 1914:

- H11 – Launched 1915
- H12 – Launched 1915
- H13 – Launched 1918, transferred to Chile
- CH-14 – Launched 1919, transferred to Canada
- CH-15 – Launched 1918, transferred to Canada
- H16 – Launched 1918, transferred to Chile
- H17 – Launched 1918, transferred to Chile
- H18 – Launched 1918, transferred to Chile
- H19 – Launched 1918, transferred to Chile
- H20 – Launched 1918, transferred to Chile

=== Group 3 ===
Group 3 was the largest group, and was constructed in 1917–1919 in Britain, shipyard space having been granted to the project and more boats needed following the seizure of those building in the United States. They were built by Vickers, Cammell Laird, Armstrong Whitworth and William Beardmore at several locations, and most of the boats enjoyed long careers in the Royal Navy:

- H21 – Launched 1918
- H22 – Launched 1918
- H23 – Launched 1918
- H24 – Launched 1918
- H25 – Launched 1918
- H26 – Launched 1918
- H27 – Launched 1918
- H28 – Launched 1918
- H29 – Launched 1918. Sank in dockyard accident 1926
- H30 – Launched 1918
- H31 – Launched 1919. Mined and sunk 1941
- H32 – Launched 1919
- H33 – Launched 1919
- H34 – Launched 1919
  - Numbers H35–H40 were ordered from Cammell Laird but cancelled in 1919
- H41 – Launched 1918. Wrecked in collision 1920
- H42 – Launched 1919. Wrecked in collision 1922
- H43 – Launched 1919
- H44 – Launched 1920
  - Numbers H45 and H46 cancelled
- H47 – Launched 1919. Wrecked in collision 1929
- H48 – Launched 1919
- H49 – Launched 1919. Sunk by German surface units 1940
- H50 – Launched 1920
- H51 – Launched 1919
- H52 – Launched 1919
  - Numbers H53 and H54 cancelled

== See also ==
- List of submarines of the Second World War
- List of submarine classes of the Royal Navy

== Bibliography ==
- Fisher, E. C. Jr.; Drashpil, Boris V. & Erickson, Rolf (1977). "The Subterfuge Submarines". Warship International. XIV (3): 200–226. ISSN 0043-0374.
