= HMS Maidstone (1912) =

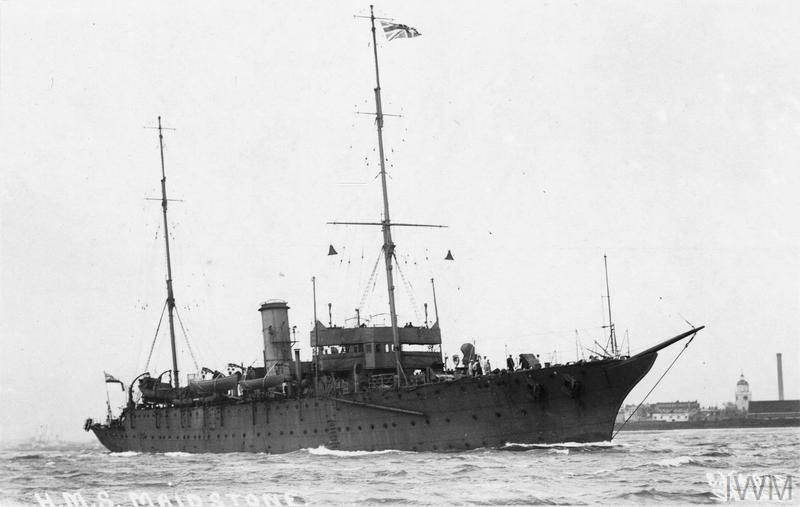
- Maidstone

History

United Kingdom
- Name: HMS Maidstone
- Namesake: Maidstone, Kent
- Ordered: 1910
- Builder: Scotts Shipbuilding and Engineering Company, Greenock
- Launched: 27 April 1912
- Commissioned: 15 October 1912
- Decommissioned: 15 December 1927
- Fate: Sold 31 August 1929

General characteristics
- Type: Submarine depot ship
- Displacement: 3,600 long tons (3,700 t) (normal load)
- Length: 355 ft (108 m)
- Beam: 45 ft (14 m)
- Draught: 17 ft 9.5 in (5.423 m) (deep load)
- Installed power: 2,800 shp (2,100 kW)
- Propulsion: triple-expansion steam engines
- Speed: 14.3 knots (26.5 km/h; 16.5 mph)
- Range: 3,000 nmi (5,600 km; 3,500 mi) at 10 knots (19 km/h; 12 mph)
- Boats & landing craft carried: three 35 ft (11 m) motor boats two 30 ft (9.1 m) cutters two 27 ft (8.2 m) whalers two 16 ft (4.9 m) skiffs one 13 ft 6 in (4.11 m) balsa raft
- Complement: 159

HMS Maidstone was a submarine depot ship of the Royal Navy. She was purpose built to support 12 of the new 'D' Class submarines under the 1910/11 Naval Programme.

== Pennant numbers ==
Pennant Number	From	To
P39	6 December 1914	1 January 1918
P4A	1 January 1918	Early 1919

== Service history ==
=== Pre-war ===
Maidstone commissioned at Portsmouth on 15 October 1912, as the principal depot ship of the officer commanding the newly established 8th Submarine Flotilla. This was the offensive submarine force based in UK waters.

=== First World War ===
Maidstone led the 8th Submarine Flotilla to its war station at Harwich in the 1914 mobilisation. She remained the principal depot ship for the offensive submarine force at Harwich for the duration of the hostilities. Maidstone's Flotilla was re-established as the 9th Submarine Flotilla in August 1916. However, this was only a change of the flotilla number and there was no change in her duties.

=== Fate ===
Maidstone decommissioned from service on 15 December 1927. She was sold on 31 August 1929.

== Sources ==
- F.J. Dittmar & J.J. Colledge (1972). British Warships 1914-1919. London: Ian Allan. ISBN 0-7110-0380-7.
- The National Archives:ADM 186/15: War Vessels and Aircraft (British and Foreign): Quarterly Return, Oct 1915
- The National Archives:ADM 53/23406, 47893-47941, 80240-80247: Logs of HMS Maidstone
