= HMS Versatile =

Destroyer of the Royal Navy

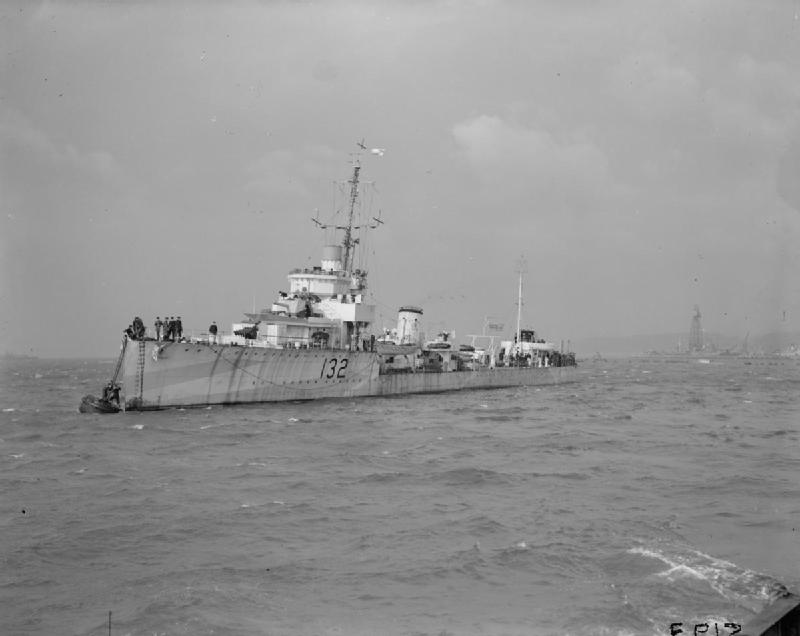
- HMS Versatile moored to a buoy during World War II sometime after the May 1940 change of her pennant number to I32.

History

United Kingdom
- Name: HMS Versatile
- Namesake: versatile
- Ordered: 30 June 1916
- Builder: Hawthorn Leslie and Company, Tyneside
- Laid down: 31 January 1917
- Launched: 31 October 1917
- Completed: 11 February 1918
- Commissioned: 11 February 1918
- Decommissioned: October 1936
- Identification: Pennant number: F29 (1917); G10; D32 (interwar); I32 (May 1940)
- Recommissioned: 1939
- Decommissioned: summer 1945
- Motto: Omnibus eadem ("The same in all (winds)")
- Honours and awards: Battle honours for: Atlantic 1939–1945; North Sea 1941–1945; Normandy 1944; English Channel 1944–1945
- Fate: Sold for scrapping 7 May 1947
- Badge: A gold weather vane on a black field

General characteristics
- Class & type: Admiralty V-class destroyer
- Displacement: 1,272–1,339 tons
- Length: 300 ft (91.4 m) o/a, 312 ft (95.1 m) p/p
- Beam: 26 ft 9 in (8.2 m)
- Draught: 9 ft (2.7 m) standard, 11 ft 3 in (3.4 m) deep
- Propulsion: 3 Yarrow type Water-tube boilers; Brown-Curtis steam turbines; 2 shafts, 27,000 shp
- Speed: 34 kt
- Range: 320–370 tons oil, 3,500 nmi at 15 kt, 900 nmi at 32 kt
- Complement: 110
- Armament: 4 × QF 4 in Mk.V (102mm L/45), mount P Mk.I; 2 × QF 2 pdr Mk.II "pom-pom" (40 mm L/39) or; 1 z QF 12 pdr 20 cwt Mk.I (76 mm), mount HA Mk.II; 4 (2x2) tubes for 21 in torpedoes

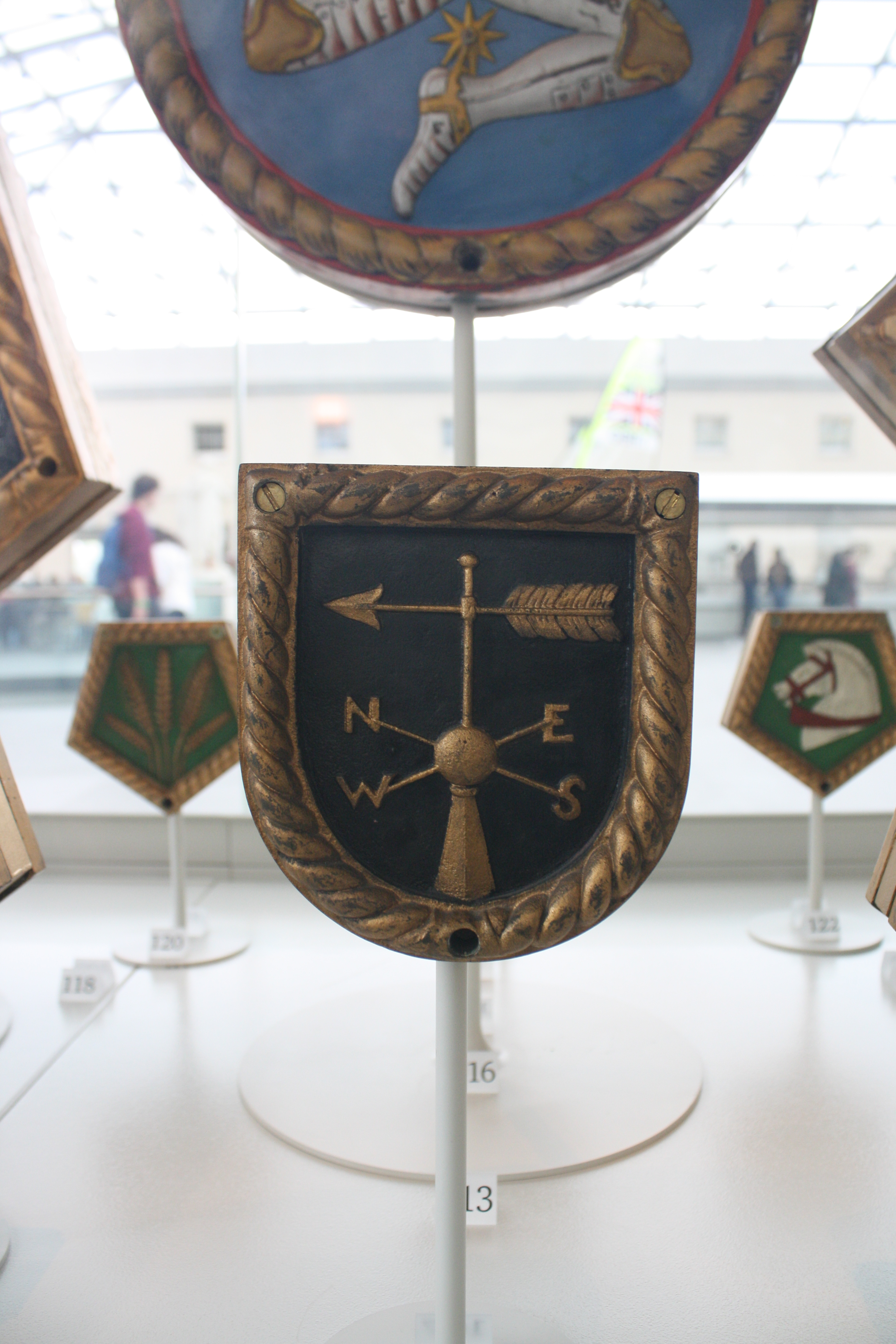
Ship's crest of HMS Versatile, depicting a gold weather vane on a black field, photographed at the National Maritime Museum in Greenwich, England, on 3 June 2012.

HMS Versatile (D32) was an Admiralty V-class destroyer of the British Royal Navy that saw service in World War I, the Russian Civil War, and World War II.

== Construction and commissioning ==
Versatile, the first Royal Navy ship of the name, was ordered on 30 June 1916 as part of the 9th Order of the 1916–17 Naval Programme. She was laid down on 31 January 1917 by Hawthorn Leslie and Company at Tyneside, England, and launched on 31 October 1917. She was completed on 11 February 1918 and commissioned into service the same day. Her original pennant number, F29, was later changed to G10 and became D32 during the interwar period.

== Service history ==
=== World War I ===
All V- and W-class destroyers, Versatile among them, were assigned to the Grand Fleet or Harwich Force. Versatile saw service in the last year of World War I.

=== Interwar years ===
During 1919, Versatile took part in the British campaign against Bolshevik forces in the Baltic Sea during the Russian Civil War. Sailors of the ship took part in the Royal Navy mutiny of 1919. She then served in the 1st Destroyer Flotilla in the Atlantic Fleet.

On 23 March 1922, Versatile was steaming off Europa Point, Gibraltar, at 20 knots with other destroyers while British submarines practised attacks on them. The submarine H42 surfaced unexpectedly only 30 or 120 yards (27 or 110 meters) – sources differ – ahead of her. Versatile went to full speed astern on her engines and put her helm over hard to port, but had not yet begun to answer her helm when she rammed H42 abaft the conning tower, almost slicing the submarine in half. H42 sank with the loss of all hands. An investigation found H42 at fault for surfacing where she did against instructions.

In 1931, Versatile joined her flotilla in a three-week cruise to various ports on the Baltic Sea. In October 1936, she was decommissioned, transferred to the Reserve Fleet, and placed in reserve at the Nore.

With tensions between the United Kingdom and Nazi Germany rising, the Royal Navy recommissioned Versatile in 1939.

=== World War II ===
==== 1939–1940 ====
When the United Kingdom entered World War II in September 1939, Versatile deployed with the 11th Destroyer Flotilla for convoy defence duty in the Southwestern Approaches and North Atlantic Ocean, based at Plymouth. She and the destroyer Vimy escorted Convoy OB 1 on 8 September 1939, and on 15 September 1939 she, Vimy, and the destroyer Vivacious escorted Convoy OB 5; both convoys were carrying troops and equipment of the British Expeditionary Force from the United Kingdom to France. On 3 February 1940, she joined the destroyers Broke and Winchelsea and the sloop Enchantress as they briefly escorted Convoy OG 17F during the first hours of its voyage from the United Kingdom to Gibraltar. She performed a similar duty for Gibraltar-bound Convoy OG 18F on 11 February 1940 with the sloops Bideford and Leith. From 12 to 15 February 1940, Versatile joined Enchantress, the sloop Folkestone, the minesweeper Gossamer, and the submarine Otway as the escort for Convoy HG 18F during the final leg of its voyage from Gibraltar to Liverpool.

In May 1940 – the month in which her pennant number was changed to I32 – Versatile was detached from convoy duty after escorting Convoy OB 144 and, after refuelling at Plymouth, was assigned to operations related to the evacuation of Allied personnel from the Netherlands, Belgium, and France in the face of the successful German offensive there. On 12 May 1940 she ran aground on the Dutch coast but was towed off by the destroyer Walpole. Early on 13 May 1940, Versatile arrived off the Hook of Holland to take part in Operation Ordnance, the evacuation of Allied personnel from that port. That evening, she was underway in the North Sea as an escort for the destroyer Hereward, upon which Queen Wilhelmina of the Netherlands was embarked for passage to Breskens, when German aircraft attacked at 20:45 hours. One bomb struck Versatile's upper deck, causing her engine room to flood, and splinters from that bomb and several near misses killed nine men, fatally injured another, wounded a third of her crew, and damaged her steam pipe, causing her to go dead in the water. The destroyer HMS Janus (F53) towed her to Sheerness, England, for repairs.

After completing repairs in June 1940, Versatile was assigned to the 21st Destroyer Flotilla at Sheerness and began convoy duty in the English Channel and Southwestern Approaches. On 27 June 1940, about 150 nautical miles (278 km) west of Ushant, France, at 48°47′00″N 007°59′00″W, she rescued 13 of the 40 survivors of the Royal Navy special service vessel Prunella, a submarine decoy vessel or "Q-ship" which the German submarine U-28 had sunk on 21 June 1940 at 49°20′00″N 008°40′00″W with the loss of 56 lives.

In July 1940, Versatile's duties expanded to include anti-invasion patrols as the threat of a German invasion of the United Kingdom grew. She came under air attack again on 3 July, avoiding damage, and again escaped damage on 10 July when German aircraft attacked a convoy she was escorting in the English Channel off Dungeness, although one ship of the convoy was sunk. She had frequent encounters with German aircraft through August 1940.

On 25 August 1940, Versatile and Vimy were transferred to the Home Fleet at Scapa Flow in the Orkney Islands and on 31 August 1940 were ordered to raise steam to intercept a German naval force reported to have shelled Eastbourne on England's east coast. In early September Versatile escorted Convy BAS 31 from the River Clyde to Iceland and received orders en route to alter course to avoid a reported German invasion force bound for Iceland. On 11 September 1940, she, Vimy, and the destroyer Jackal escorted the auxiliary minelayers Menestheus, Port Napier, Port Quebec, and Southern Prince of the 1st Minelaying Squadron as they laid mines in the Southwestern Approaches in Operation SN41, after which Versatile remained on convoy duty around Scotland for the rest of September. On 30 September, she cooperated with a Royal Air Force Avro Anson aircraft in a search for a German submarine after the merchant ship Fort George reported sighting a periscope.

From 3 to 5 October 1940, Versatile was part of the escort of Convoy WS 3A Slow during the portion of its voyage that took place in the Southwestern Approaches, joining the destroyer Harvester in screening the passenger liner Highland Brigade. During this activity, her Asdic and degaussing coil both failed, and the following day she began to experience serious oil leaks into her living spaces. After undergoing temporary repairs at Derry (also called Londonderry) in Northern Ireland, on 10 October 1940, she proceeded to the River Tyne for a refit and repairs.

==== 1941–1942 ====
Upon completion of her refit, Versatile returned to escort duty in the Southwestern Approaches. Almost all the convoys she escorted came under German air attack. On 27 January 1941, her steering gear failed in the English Channel while she was operating near merchant ships in rough waters and with little manoeuvring room, but she managed to avoid a collision with the ships she was escorting.

In February 1941, Versatile was transferred to Harwich for convoy defence duty in the North Sea. She was in action along with the destroyer Berkeley and corvette Sheldrake with German motor torpedo boats – S-boats, known to the Allies as "E-boats" – in the North Sea off Lowestoft on 6 March 1941 while escorting Convoy FN 26. On 13 March 1941, she attacked a submarine contact. She reported on 14 March 1941 that the merchant ship Hereport had struck a mine and sunk, and she rescued 11 survivors and took them to Sheerness; that evening, a German S boat attacked her unsuccessfully. She reported on 16 March that the merchant ship Mexico had struck a mine and sunk, and on 26 March she shot down a German Messerschmitt Bf 110 that attacked a convoy she was escorting in the North Sea.

For the rest of 1941 and throughout 1942, Versatile escorted convoys in the North Sea, defending them against frequent German air attacks. She was "adopted" by the civil community of Tipton in Staffordshire in a Warship Week fundraising campaign in February 1942. On 12 February 1942, she was one of the few British warships able to respond to the "Channel Dash" of the German battleships Scharnhorst and Gneisenau and heavy cruiser Prinz Eugen from Brest, France, to Germany via the English Channel, Strait of Dover, and North Sea.

==== 1943–1945 ====
Near the end of 1942, the Royal Navy selected Versatile for conversion into a long-range escort, and in January 1943 she left her North Sea duties and entered the shipyard of the Grangemouth Dockyard Company at Grangemouth, Scotland, for conversion. After its completion and passing her post-conversion sea trials, Versatile was assigned to the 7th Escort Group in September 1943 and began convoy escort duty in the Western Approaches. She continued in this role until April 1944, when she was selected for service in Force J in support of the upcoming Allied invasion of Normandy, scheduled for early June 1944. In May 1944 she took part in exercises with Force J in the English Channel to prepare for the invasion.

In early June 1944, Versatile deployed in The Solent with Force J to escort convoys to the invasion beaches, and she and a Royal Navy Coastal Forces motor launch joined Convoy J 14 – consisting of the infantry landing ship Royal Ulsterman, 12 infantry landing craft, 24 tank landing craft, two antiaircraft landing craft, one rocket tank landing craft, and one United States Coast Guard vessel – as its escort on 4 June 1944. The invasion was postponed from 5 to 6 June due to bad weather, but on 5 June Convoy J 14 began its voyage to Juno Beach, arriving at its launch point on 6 June 1944 half an hour before the landings. On 7 June, Versatile embarked Rear Admiral William G. Tennant, who was in command of the Mulberry harbour operation and of the undersea pipeline effort known as Operation Pluto, to witness the sinking of blockships off Sword Beach to form a Mulberry harbour. On 8 June 1944, she arrived at Portland to begin the daily escort of the EPL 2 series of tank landing ship convoys between the United Kingdom and the invasion beaches.

Released from operations related to the invasion in July 1944, Versatile returned to convoy defence and patrol duties, conducting them in the English Channel and Southwestern Approaches until the surrender of Germany in early May 1945.

== Decommissioning and disposal ==
Versatile was decommissioned soon after Germany's surrender, no longer being carried on the Royal Navy's active list by July 1945. By 1947 she was on the disposal list, and she was sold on 7 May 1947 for scrapping by M. Brechin at Granton, Scotland. She arrived at the shipbreaker's yard on 10 September 1948.

== Bibliography ==
- Carew, Anthony (1981). The Lower Deck of the Royal Navy 1900-39: The Invergordon Mutiny in Perspective. Manchester University Press. ISBN 9780719008412.
- Campbell, John (1985). Naval Weapons of World War II. Annapolis, Maryland: Naval Institute Press. ISBN 0-87021-459-4.
- Chesneau, Roger, ed. (1980). Conway's All the World's Fighting Ships 1922–1946. Greenwich, UK: Conway Maritime Press. ISBN 0-85177-146-7.
- Colledge, J. J.; Warlow, Ben (2006) [1969]. Ships of the Royal Navy: The Complete Record of All Fighting Ships of the Royal Navy from the 15th Century to the Present (3rd Rev ed.). London: Chatham Publishing. ISBN 978-1-86176-281-8. OCLC 67375475.
- Cocker, Maurice. Destroyers of the Royal Navy, 1893–1981. Ian Allan. ISBN 0-7110-1075-7.
- Friedman, Norman (2009). British Destroyers From Earliest Days to the Second World War. Annapolis, Maryland: Naval Institute Press. ISBN 978-1-59114-081-8.
- Gardiner, Robert & Gray, Randal, eds. (1985). Conway's All the World's Fighting Ships 1906–1921. Annapolis, Maryland: Naval Institute Press. ISBN 0-85177-245-5.
- Lenton, H. T. (1998). British & Empire Warships of the Second World War. Annapolis, Maryland: Naval Institute Press. ISBN 1-55750-048-7.
- March, Edgar J. (1966). British Destroyers: A History of Development, 1892–1953; Drawn by Admiralty Permission From Official Records & Returns, Ships' Covers & Building Plans. London: Seeley Service. OCLC 164893555.
- Preston, Antony (1971). 'V & W' Class Destroyers 1917–1945. London: Macdonald. OCLC 464542895.
- Raven, Alan & Roberts, John (1979). 'V' and 'W' Class Destroyers. Man o'War. Vol. 2. London: Arms & Armour. ISBN 0-85368-233-X.
- Rohwer, Jürgen (2005). Chronology of the War at Sea 1939–1945: The Naval History of World War Two (Third Revised ed.). Annapolis, Maryland: Naval Institute Press. ISBN 1-59114-119-2.
- Whinney, Bob (2000). The U-boat Peril: A Fight for Survival. Cassell. ISBN 0-304-35132-6.
- Whitley, M. J. (1988). Destroyers of World War 2. Annapolis, Maryland: Naval Institute Press. ISBN 0-87021-326-1.
- Winser, John de D. (1999). B.E.F. Ships Before, At and After Dunkirk. Gravesend, Kent: World Ship Society. ISBN 0-905617-91-6.
