= HMS H51 =

Submarine of the Royal Navy

History

United Kingdom
- Name: HMS H51
- Builder: HM Dockyard, Pembroke Dock
- Launched: 15 November 1918
- Commissioned: 1 September 1919
- Fate: Sold for scrapping, 6 June 1924

General characteristics
- Class & type: H-class submarine
- Displacement: 423 long tons (430 t) surfaced; 510 long tons (518 t) submerged
- Length: 171 ft 0 in (52.12 m)
- Beam: 15 ft 4 in (4.67 m)
- Propulsion: 1 × 480 hp (358 kW) diesel engine; 2 × 620 hp (462 kW) electric motors
- Speed: 11.5 knots (21.3 km/h; 13.2 mph) surfaced; 9 knots (17 km/h; 10 mph) submerged
- Range: 2,985 nmi (5,528 km) at 7.5 kn (13.9 km/h; 8.6 mph) surfaced; 130 nmi (240 km) at 2 kn (3.7 km/h; 2.3 mph) submerged
- Complement: 22
- Armament: 4 × 21 in (533 mm) bow torpedo tubes; 8 × 21-inch torpedoes

HMS H51 was a British H-class submarine built by HM Dockyard, Pembroke Dock. She was laid down on an unknown date, launched on 15 November 1918 and commissioned into the British Royal Navy on 1 September 1919. The submarine had a complement of twenty-two crew members. HMS H51 was sold for scrapping on 6 June 1924 and was then resold on 17 July 1924 to the ship breakers.

== Design ==
Like all post-H20 British H-class submarines, H51 had a displacement of 423 long tons (430 t) at the surface and 510 long tons (520 t) while submerged. It had a total length of 171 feet (52 m), a beam of 15 feet 4 inches (4.67 m), and a draught of 12 metres (39 ft). It contained a diesel engines providing a total power of 480 horsepower (360 kW) and two electric motors each providing 320 horsepower (240 kW) power. The use of its electric motors made the submarine travel at 11 knots (20 km/h; 13 mph). It would normally carry 16.4 long tons (16.7 t) of fuel and had a maximum capacity of 18 long tons (18 t).

The submarine had a maximum surface speed of 13 knots (24 km/h; 15 mph) and a submerged speed of 10.5 knots (19.4 km/h; 12.1 mph). Post-H20 British H-class submarines had ranges of 2,985 nautical miles (5,528 km; 3,435 mi) at speeds of 7.5 knots (13.9 km/h; 8.6 mph) when surfaced. H51 was fitted with an anti-aircraft gun and four 21-inch (533 mm) torpedo tubes. Its torpedo tubes were fitted to the bow and the submarine was loaded with eight 21 in (533 mm) torpedoes. It is a Holland 602 type submarine but was designed to meet Royal Navy specifications. Its complement was twenty-two crew members.

== Bibliography ==
- Harrison, A. N. (January 1979). "The Development of HM Submarines From Holland No. 1 (1901) to Porpoise (1930) (BR3043)". United Kingdom Ministry of Defence – via RN Subs.
- Hutchinson, Robert (2001). Jane's submarines : war beneath the waves from 1776 to the present day. London: HarperCollins. ISBN 978-0007105588.
