= H9 =

H9, H09 or H-9 may refer to:

== Cars ==
- Haval H9, a Chinese SUV
- Hongqi H9, a Chinese luxury car

== Ships ==
- HMS Acasta (H09), a 1929 British Royal Navy A class destroyer
- HMS H9, a 1915 British Royal Navy H class submarine
- HMS Rotherham (H09), a 1942 British Royal Navy R class destroyer
- USS H-9, a 1918 United States Navy H class submarine

== Roads ==
- H9 Groveway, a road in the Milton Keynes grid road system
- H-09 (Michigan county highway)
- Highway H09 (Ukraine)

== Other uses ==
- PRR H9, an American steam locomotive model
- H9 (Long Island bus), a Huntington Area Rapid Transit bus route in Suffolk County, New York
- London Buses route H9
- British NVC community H9, a type of heath community in the British National Vegetation Classification
- DSC-H9, a 2007 Sony Cyber-shot H series camera
- Pegasus Airlines, by IATA code

== See also ==
- 9H (disambiguation)
