= HMS H8 =

Submarine of the Royal Navy

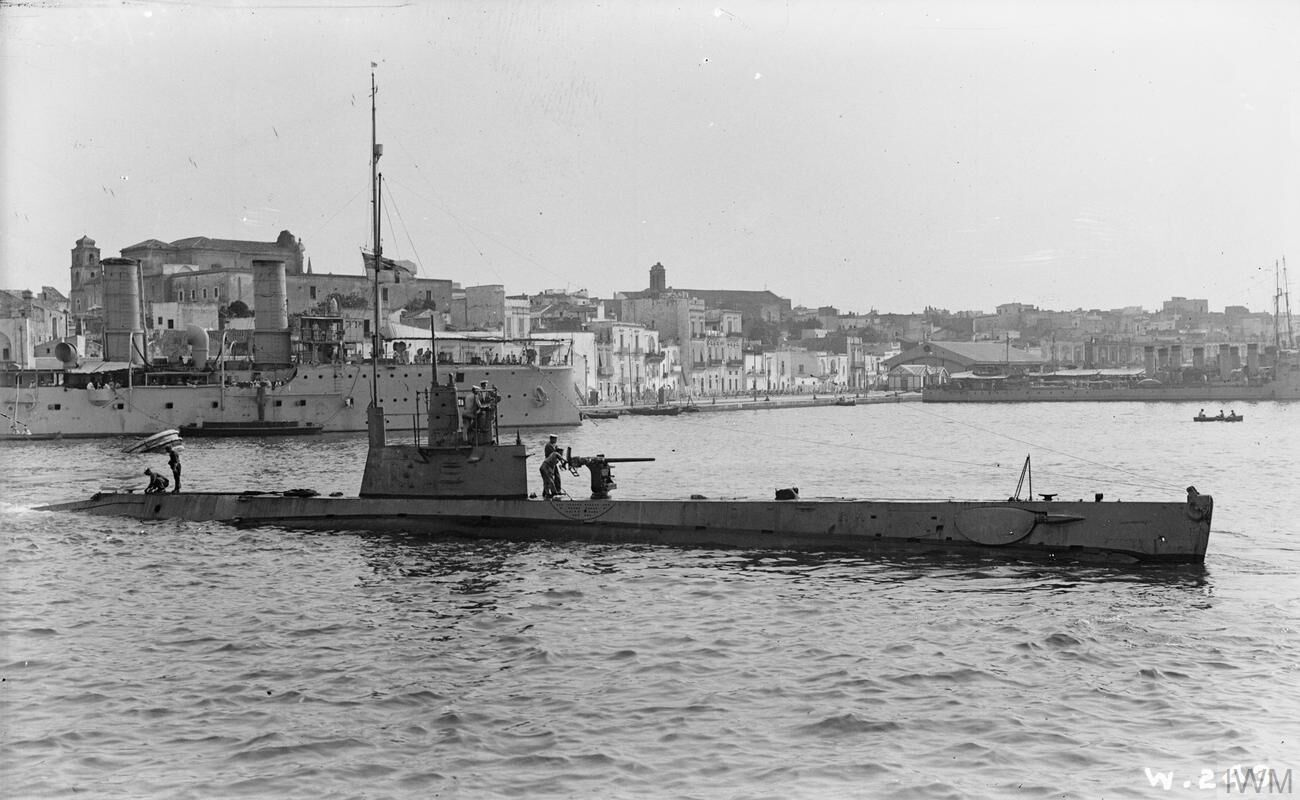
- HMS H4, another submarine of the same class

History

United Kingdom
- Name: HMS H8
- Builder: Canadian Vickers, Montreal
- Laid down: 19 May 1915
- Commissioned: June 1915
- Fate: Sold, 29 November 1921

General characteristics
- Class & type: H-class submarine
- Displacement: 364 long tons (370 t) surfaced; 434 long tons (441 t) submerged
- Length: 150 ft 3 in (45.80 m)
- Beam: 15 ft 4 in (4.67 m)
- Propulsion: 1 × 480 hp (358 kW) diesel engine; 2 × 620 hp (462 kW) electric motors
- Speed: 13 knots (24 km/h; 15 mph) surfaced; 10 knots (19 km/h; 12 mph) submerged
- Range: 1,600 nmi (3,000 km) at 10 kn (19 km/h; 12 mph) surfaced; 130 nmi (240 km) at 2 kn (3.7 km/h; 2.3 mph) submerged
- Complement: 22
- Armament: 4 × 18 in (457 mm) bow torpedo tubes; 6 × 18 inch torpedoes

HMS H8 was a British H-class submarine built by the Canadian Vickers Co., Montreal. She was laid down on 19 May 1915 and commissioned in June 1915. Like other Canadian-built submarines, she was sailed across the Atlantic for service in the North Sea and as recognition of this she initially remained under the command of her Canadian captain, Lieutenant-Commander B. L. Johnson, R.N.R. with a largely reserve crew. HMS H8 was sold on 29 November 1921 in Arbroath.

== Design ==
She had a displacement of 364 long tons (370 t) at the surface and 434 long tons (441 t) while submerged. Her total length was 150 feet 3 inches (45.8 m), with a beam of 15 feet 4 inches (4.7 m) and a draught of 12 feet (3.7 m).

Her two diesel engines provided a total power of 480 horsepower (360 kW) and her two electric motors provided 320 horsepower (240 kW) power which gave the submarine a maximum surface speed of 13 knots (24 km/h; 15 mph) and a submerged speed of 11 knots (20 km/h; 13 mph). She would normally carry 16.4 long tons (16.7 t) of fuel and had a maximum capacity of 18 long tons (18 t) and a range of 1,600 nautical miles (2,963 km; 1,841 mi). The boat was armed with a 6-pounder (2.7 kg) Hotchkiss quick-firing gun and four 18-inch (457 mm) bow torpedo tubes with six 18-inch (457 mm) torpedoes carried. The complement was twenty-two crew members.

== Bibliography ==
- Gardiner, Robert (1985). Conway's All the World's Fighting Ships 1906–1921. Conway Maritime Press. ISBN 0-85177-245-5.
- Robert Hutchinson. Submarines, War Beneath The Waves, From 1776 To The Present Day.
- William Guy Carr. By Guess and by God.
