= HMS H5 =

Submarine of the Royal Navy

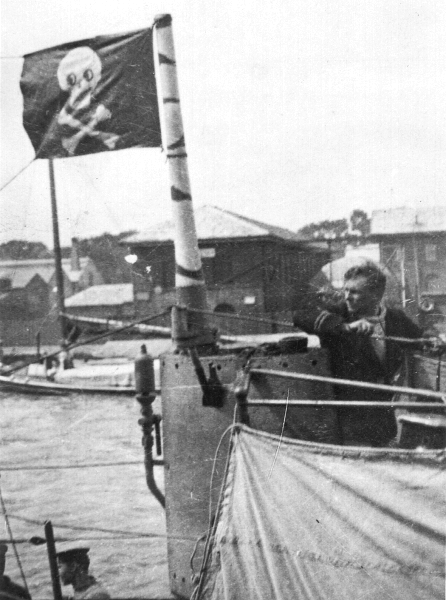
- A view from the bridge of HMS H5.

History

United Kingdom
- Name: H5
- Builder: Canadian Vickers, Montreal
- Laid down: 11 January 1915
- Launched: 1 April 1915
- Commissioned: 10 June 1915
- Fate: Sunk, 2 March 1918

General characteristics
- Class & type: H-class submarine
- Displacement: 364 long tons (370 t) surfaced; 434 long tons (441 t) submerged
- Length: 150 ft 3 in (45.80 m)
- Beam: 15 ft 4 in (4.67 m)
- Propulsion: 1 × 480 hp (358 kW) diesel engine; 2 × 620 hp (462 kW) electric motors
- Speed: 13 knots (24 km/h; 15 mph) surfaced; 10 knots (19 km/h; 12 mph) submerged
- Range: 1,600 nmi (3,000 km) at 10 kn (19 km/h; 12 mph) surfaced; 130 nmi (240 km) at 2 kn (3.7 km/h; 2.3 mph) submerged
- Complement: 22
- Armament: 4 × 18 in (457 mm) bow torpedo tubes; 6 × 18 inch torpedoes

HMS H5 was a British H-class submarine of the Royal Navy that served in the First World War. The boat, which was launched on 1 April 1915, was lost after being rammed by a British merchant ship off Caernarfon Bay in March 1918. It had been mistaken as a German U-boat and sank with the loss of all hands.

== Design ==
She had a displacement of 364 long tons (370 t) at the surface and 434 long tons (441 t) while submerged. Her total length was 150 feet 3 inches (45.8 m), with a beam of 15 feet 4 inches (4.7 m) and a draught of 12 feet (3.7 m).

Her two diesel engines provided a total power of 480 horsepower (360 kW) and her two electric motors provided 320 horsepower (240 kW) power which gave the submarine a maximum surface speed of 13 knots (24 km/h; 15 mph) and a submerged speed of 11 knots (20 km/h; 13 mph). She would normally carry 16.4 long tons (16.7 t) of fuel and had a maximum capacity of 18 long tons (18 t) and a range of 1,600 nautical miles (2,963 km; 1,841 mi). The boat was armed with a 6-pounder (2.7 kg) Hotchkiss quick-firing gun and four 18-inch (457 mm) bow torpedo tubes with six 18-inch (457 mm) torpedoes carried. The complement was twenty-two crew members.

== Service record ==
On 14 July 1916 H5 spotted the SM U-51 leaving the Ems and torpedoed her. U-51 sank with the loss of 34 of her crew; four men survived.

== Sinking ==
HMS H5 was sunk after being rammed by the British merchantman Rutherglen when mistaken for a German U-boat on 2 March 1918. All on board perished including a US Navy observer, Lieutenant Earle Wayne Freed Childs from the American submarine AL-2. He became the first US submariner to lose his life in the First World War. All on board are commemorated on Panel 29 at Royal Navy Submarine Museum. The wreck's site is designated as a controlled site under the Protection of Military Remains Act. In 2010, a plaque commemorating the 26 crew was dedicated on Armed Forces Day in Holyhead.
