= Holland 602 type submarine =

Submarine type in use in World War I

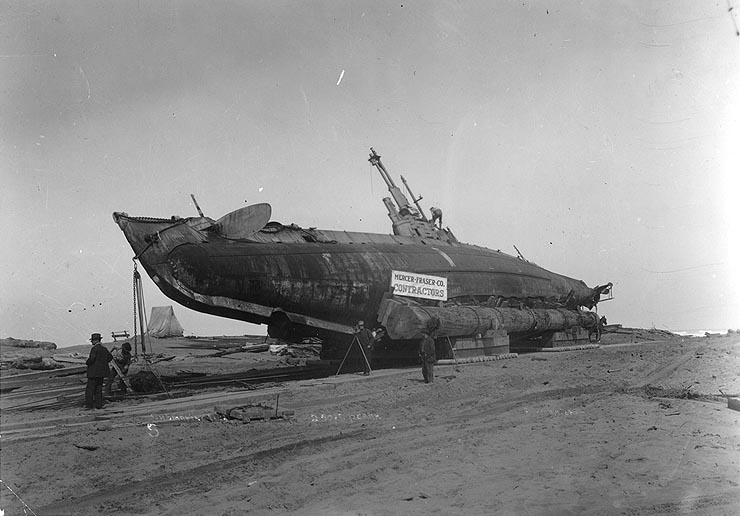
- USS H-3 served as the prototype for the class

Class overview
- Builders: Vickers Canada
- Operators: United States Navy; Chilean Navy; Royal Navy; Imperial Russian Navy; (Ukraine) Ukrainian State Navy; Soviet Navy; Regia Marina; Royal Canadian Navy; Royal Netherlands Navy
- In service: 1915
- In commission: 1950

General characteristics
- Type: Submarine
- Displacement: 390 tons surfaced; 520 tons submerged
- Length: 46 m (150.9 ft)
- Beam: 4.9 m (16.1 ft)
- Draught: 3.8 m (12.5 ft)
- Installed power: 2 × 240 hp (179 kW) diesel engines; 2 × 310 hp (231 kW) electric motors
- Propulsion: 2 × propeller shafts
- Speed: 14.5 knots (26.9 km/h) surfaced; 10.5 knots (19.4 km/h) submerged
- Complement: 32
- Sensors & processing systems: Fessenden transducer
- Armament: 4 × bow torpedo tubes; 8 torpedoes; 1 × 45 mm semi-automatic gun (200 rounds) or; 1 × 47 mm gun; 1 × machine gun

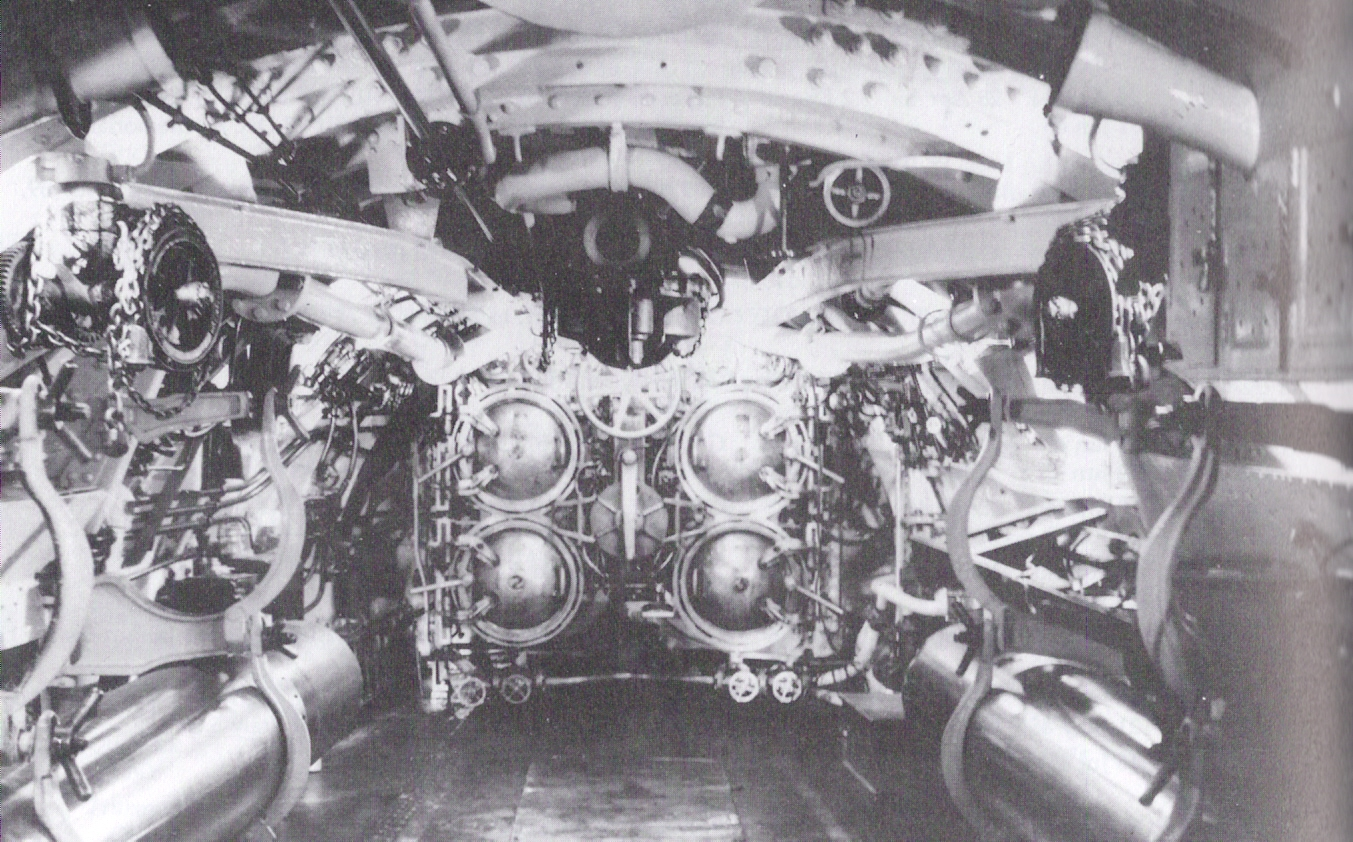
The torpedo room of USS H-5 in 1919. The breeches of the four 18-inch (457 mm) torpedo tubes are at center

The Holland 602 type submarine, also known as the H-class submarine, was one of the most numerous submarines of World War I. The type was designed by the Electric Boat Co. of the United States, but most of the boats were built abroad: in Canada by the subsidiary of the British Vickers company and in British shipyards.

Operators included the United States Navy, the Chilean Navy, the Royal Navy (33 submarines), the Imperial Russian Navy, the Soviet Navy, the Italian Regia Marina, the Royal Canadian Navy, the Royal Dutch Navy and the navy of the short-lived Ukrainian State.

== Background and history ==
The predecessor for this class were two submarines ordered in 1911 for the Chilean Navy, to the John Philip Holland design 19-E and design 19-B. These eventually became the CC-class submarines of the Royal Canadian Navy.

Origin of project's number is in Electric Boat company rule, according to which, project variant for export purposes was named with replaced digits and with adding 0 between them. Thus, project EB 26 became the project EB 602.

Three prototypes were then built to an improved design 30, with an increased displacement of 358/434 tons. These became the United States H-class submarines and were designated H-1, H-2 and H-3.

In October 1914, after the start of World War I, the British Admiralty ordered ten submarines to design 602E, to be built by Canadian Vickers in Montreal, Quebec. These would become the British H-class submarines. Another ten submarines were secretly constructed at Fore River Yard at Quincy, Massachusetts, in the then neutral United States. This group was impounded by the United States government and ended up in the Chilean Navy and the Royal Canadian Navy after the American declaration of war. A third group, of twenty-five British H-class subs, was constructed in 1917-1919 in Britain, many of them serving in World War II.

In the summer of 1915 eight type 602 submarines were ordered by the Italian Regia Marina. These were built in Montreal, Quebec.

In 1917 the Imperial Russian Navy ordered a total of 17 submarines for its Baltic and Black Sea Fleets. These were built at a temporary shipyard in Barnet on Burrard Inlet outside Vancouver, British Columbia. They were then disassembled, taken by ship to Vladivostok, by the Trans-Siberian Railroad to Saint Petersburg and Nikolayev to be reassembled in Russian shipyards. In Russia they were known as the Amerikansky Golland-class submarines.

Six of the boats were undelivered at the time of the Russian Revolution of 1917. These were later bought by the United States Navy, and after reassembly at the Puget Sound Navy Yard, they became the United States H-class submarines H-4 - H-9. In 1918 the Black Sea Fleet submarines АG-21-АG-26 were taken over by the Ukrainian State Navy. In May 1918 the Finnish Navy salvaged AG-16 and AG-12; two of the Baltic Fleet submarines that had been scuttled off Hanko at the end of the Finnish Civil War but was unable to afford to refit them for service.

== Submarines ==
=== Royal Navy ===
- H class (42 in total)
  - Group 1 (1915)
    - HMS H1 - HMS H10 (10 boats)
  - Group 2 (1915–1918, The whole group was impounded by the US government.)
    - HMS H11, HMS H12 (2 boats) delivered after US declaration of war.
    - HMS H13, HMS H16 - HMS H20 (6 boats) were transferred to Chile
    - HMS H14, HMS H15 (2 boats) were transferred to Canada
  - Group 3 (1917–1919)
    - HMS H21 - HMS H52 (25 boats; H53, H54 cancelled)

=== United States Navy ===
- United States H-class submarines
  - USS H-1 - H-3 (3 boats, prototypes)
  - USS H-4 - H-9 (6 boats, originally built for the Imperial Russian Navy)

=== Italian Regia Marina ===
- Italian H1 - H8 (8 boats)

=== Imperial Russian Navy ===
- American Holland-class submarine
  - Group 1 Baltic Fleet
    - AG-11 - AG-16 (5 boats, AG-13 was renamed to AG-16)
  - Group 2
    - AG-17 - AG-20, AG-27 - AG-28 (6 boats) retained by US and served as USS H-4 - H-9.
  - Group 3 Black Sea Fleet
    - AG-21 - AG-26 (6 boats)

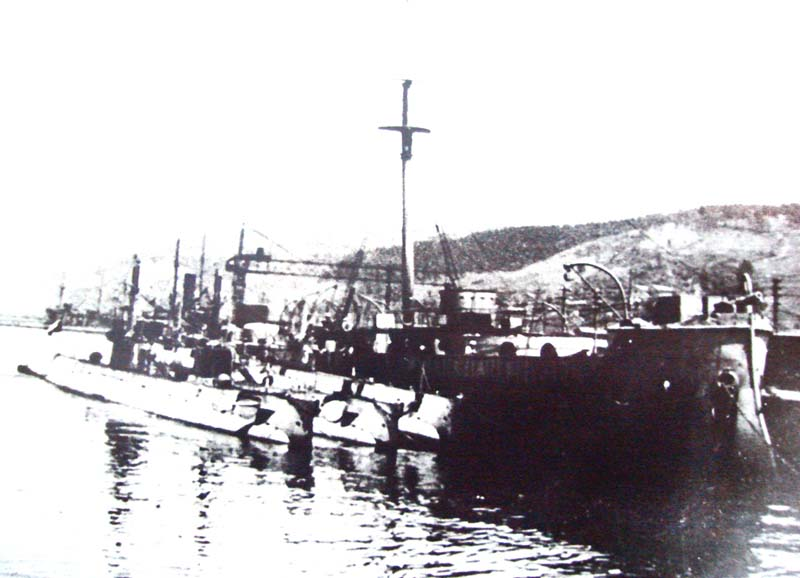
Three Chilean submarines after their arrival in Chile in 1918 with the veteran ironclad ram Huascar serving as a submarine tender at Talcahuano

=== Royal Canadian Navy ===
- CH-14 and CH-15 (2 boats) originally built for the Royal Navy

=== Chilean Navy ===
- H1 - H6 (6 boats) originally built for the Royal Navy

== See also ==
- List of submarines of the Second World War
