= List of World War II ships of less than 1000 tons =

The list of World War II ships of less than 1000-tons is an alphabetical list of minor military ships and ship classes of World War II. Only ships with a displacement of less than 1000 tons are listed. For larger vessels, see list of World War II ships. For other ship classes, see the list of World War II ship classes.

== Ship classes of World War II (1,000 tons or less) ==
Class	Type	Country	Launch years	Displacement (tons)	Number (wartime/total built)
250t	Torpedo boat/Gunboat	Romanian Naval Forces	1914	266	3
A	Submarine	Royal Norwegian Navy	1914	268	3
Acciaio	Submarine	Regia Marina	1935	697	13
Active	Patrol boat/Cutter	United States Coast Guard	1927	232	35
Adua	Submarine	Regia Marina	1936	697	17
Ægir	Submarine	Royal Danish Navy	1915	237	5
Ahven	Minesweeper	Finnish Navy	1937	17	6
Archimede	Submarine	Regia Marina	1936	985	2
Argo	Submarine	Regia Marina	1936	810	2
Argonauta	Submarine	Regia Marina	1932	667	10
B	Submarine	Royal Norwegian Navy	1923–29	365	6
Bandiera	Submarine	Regia Marina	1930	937	4
Bangor	Minesweeper	Royal Navy	1940–44	600	128
Bird	Minesweeper	Royal Navy	1938–40	607	45
Bragadin	Submarine	Regia Marina	1931	982	2
C	Submarine	Royal Danish Navy		369	3
Chang Ning	Patrol boat	Republic of China Navy		400	10
Chidori	Torpedo boat	Imperial Japanese Navy	1933	535	4
Curtatone	Torpedo boat	Regia Marina	1923–24	967	4
D	Submarine	Royal Danish Navy		369	2
Dance	Naval trawler	Royal Navy	1940	554	20
Dragen	Destroyer	Royal Danish Navy	1929–34	290	9
Draug	Destroyer	Royal Norwegian Navy	1910–13 (approx.)	578	3
Eagle	Patrol boat	United States Navy	1918-19	625	60
Flower	Corvette	Royal Navy; Royal Canadian Navy	1939–44	940	225
Gabbiano	Corvette	Regia Marina	1942	672	40
Generali	Torpedo boat	Regia Marina	1921	832	6
Gor	Gunboat/Minesweeper	Royal Norwegian Navy	1884-87	290	2
H	Submarine	Royal Danish Navy		407	4
Ha-101	Transport submarine	Imperial Japanese Navy	1944–1945	501	10
Ha-201	Submarine	Imperial Japanese Navy	1945	440	10
Isles	Naval trawler	Royal Navy	1940–44	554	145
Jaskółka	Minesweeper	Polish Navy	1934–1938	183	6
Kuha	Minesweeper	Finnish Navy	1941–46	18	6
Kyzikos	Torpedo boat	Hellenic Navy	1914–15	270	3
La Masa	Torpedo boat	Regia Marina	1917	840	8
Mackerel	Submarine	United States Navy	1940–41	825	2
Mameli	Submarine	Regia Marina	1929	880	4
Momi	Destroyer	Imperial Japanese Navy	1918–23	770	21
Momo	Destroyer	Imperial Japanese Navy	1917–18	835	4
Najaden	Torpedo boat	Royal Danish Navy	1943	782	2
Odin	Destroyer	Royal Norwegian Navy	1939	632	3
Ōtori	Torpedo boat	Imperial Japanese Navy	1935–37	840	8
Oruç Reis	Submarine	Royal Navy	1940	856	4
Orsa	Torpedo boat	Regia Marina	1938	840	4
Perla	Submarine	Regia Marina	1936	697	10
Pichincha	Coast Guard vessel	Colombia		120	3
Pilo	Torpedo boat	Regia Marina	1915	770	7
Pisani	Submarine	Regia Marina	1930	880	4
Proussa	Torpedo boat	Hellenic Navy	1915–16	266	2
R	Submarine	United States Navy	1918–19	570	27
Ro-100	Submarine	Imperial Japanese Navy	1941–1943	782	18
S	Submarine	Royal Navy	1931–45	950	63
S	Submarine	United States Navy	1918–25	900	48
Settembrini	Submarine	Regia Marina	1932	953	
Shakespearian	Naval trawler	Royal Navy	1940	554	12
Sirena	Submarine	Regia Marina	1934	678	12
Sirtori	Torpedo boat	Regia Marina	1917	845	4
Sleipner	Destroyer	Royal Norwegian Navy	1936–38	597	3
Søbjørnen	Minesweeper	Royal Danish Navy		270	6
Spica	Torpedo boat	Regia Marina	1936–38	640	30
Squalo	Submarine	Regia Marina	1930	933	4
Trad	Torpedo boat	Royal Thai Navy	1935–37	262	9
Tree	Naval trawler	Royal Navy	1939–40	545	20
Trygg	Torpedo boat	Royal Norwegian Navy	1919–21	220	3
Type 23	Torpedo boat	Kriegsmarine	1926	923	6
Type 24	Torpedo boat	Kriegsmarine	1926–27	923	6
Type 35	Torpedo boat	Kriegsmarine	1937–39	844	12
Type 37	Torpedo boat	Kriegsmarine	1938–40	853	9
Type I	Submarine	Kriegsmarine	1936	892	2
Type II	Submarine	Kriegsmarine	1939–40	300	50
U	Submarine	Royal Navy	1938-43	540	49
Vale	Gunboat	Royal Norwegian Navy	1874-78	260	5
Vedenia	Motor torpedo boat	Romanian Naval Forces	1943–44	30	6
Wakatake	Destroyer	Imperial Japanese Navy	1922–23	900	6
Wilk	Submarine	Polish Navy	1929–1931	980	3
X	Submarine	Royal Navy	1943–45	30	14
XE	Submarine	Royal Navy	1943–45	33	12
XT	Training submarine	Royal Navy	1943–45	30	6

== Ships of World War II of 1,000 tons or less ==
Ship	Country	Type	Displacement (tons)	Notes
Ahti	Estonian Navy	gunboat	140-ton	
Ajonpää	Finnish Navy	minesweeper	52-ton	Ajonpää class
Amiral Murgescu	Romanian Naval Forces	minelayer	812-ton	
Aura	Finnish Navy	coast guard	400-ton	coast guard and escort vessel
Aura II	Finnish Navy	escort vessel	563-ton	presidential yacht and escort vessel
Aurora	Romanian Naval Forces	314-ton	314-ton	
B				
Baire	Cuban Revolutionary Navy	gunboat	500-ton	
Barranquilla	Colombian National Navy	gunboat	142-ton	
Bathurst	Argentine Navy	minesweeper	500-ton	Bathurst Class
Belomorec	Bulgarian Navy	patrol boat	77-ton	
Beskytteren	Royal Danish Navy	patrol vessel	415-ton	fisheries patrol vessel
Birago	German Navy	patrol boat	50-ton	ex-Siofok (Austria)
Bogota	Colombian National Navy	gunboat	360-ton	
Bouchard	Argentine Navy	minesweeper	450-ton	Bouchard class
Brand	Royal Norwegian Navy	torpedo boat	107-ton	
C				
Capitan Quevedo	Cuban Revolutionary Navy	coast guard craft	115-ton	
Carabobo	Colombian National Navy	coast guard vessel	120-ton	
Carioca	Brazilian Navy	mine layer	552-ton	
Cartagena	Colombian National Navy	gunboat	142-ton	
Chiang Kung	People's Liberation Army Navy	patrol boat	250-ton	China
Chiang Tai	People's Liberation Army Navy	patrol boat	250-ton	China
Chen Shen	People's Liberation Army Navy	river gunboat	275-ton	China
Chernomorec	Bulgarian Navy	patrol boat	77-ton	
Chi Jih	People's Liberation Army Navy	survey vessel	500-ton	China
Chien Chung	People's Liberation Army Navy	river gunboat	90-ton	China
Chien Kang	People's Liberation Army Navy	destroyer	390-ton	became Yamasemi (Japan)
Chu Chien	People's Liberation Army Navy	gunboat	740-ton	China
Chu Kuan	People's Liberation Army Navy	gunboat	740-ton	
Chu Tai	People's Liberation Army Navy	gunboat	740-ton	China
Chu Tung	People's Liberation Army Navy	gunboat	740-ton	China
Chu Yiu	People's Liberation Army Navy	gunboat	740-ton	China
Chu Yu	People's Liberation Army Navy	gunboat	740-ton	China
Chung Shan	People's Liberation Army Navy	gunboat	780-ton	ex-Yung Feng China
Cordoba	Argentine Navy	destroyer	890-ton	
Cordoba	Colombian National Navy	gunboat	360-ton	
Czajka	Polish Navy	minesweeper	183-ton	
Czapla	Polish Navy	minesweeper	183-ton	
D				
Delfinul	Romanian Naval Forces	submarine	650-ton	
Diez de Octubre	Cuban Revolutionary Navy	gunboat	218-ton	
Dragen	Royal Danish Navy	torpedo boat	290-ton	became TFA3 (Germany)
Drazki	Bulgarian Navy	torpedo boat and minesweeper	97-ton	commissioned 5 Jan 1908, today museum ship
Durres	Albanian Naval Force	patrol boat	46-ton	
E				
El Fateh	Egyptian Navy	river gunboat	128-ton	
El Zahir	Egyptian Navy	river gunboat	128-ton	
Elicura	Chilean Navy	coast guard vessel	400-ton	
F				
Fei Ying	People's Liberation Army Navy	destroyer	850-ton	
Freja	Royal Danish Navy	patrol boat	322-ton	became Sudpol (Germany), then Freya (Germany)
Fresia	Chilean Navy	submarine	435-ton	
Frøya Navy	minelayer	870-ton		
Fu Yu	People's Liberation Army Navy	gunboat	630-ton	
G				
General Haller	Polish Navy	gunboat	342-ton	
Glenten	Royal Danish Navy	torpedo boat	290-ton	
Glommen	Royal Norwegian Navy	minelayer	351-ton	
Guacolda	Chilean Navy	submarine	435-ton	
Guale	Chilean Navy	submarine	435-ton	
H				
Hafir	Egyptian Navy	river gunboat	74-ton	
Hai Fu	People's Liberation Army Navy	gunboat	166-ton	China
Hai Ho	People's Liberation Army Navy	river gunboat	211-ton	China
Hai Hung	People's Liberation Army Navy	gunboat	190-ton	China
Hai Ku	People's Liberation Army Navy	gunboat	190-ton	China
Hai Ou	People's Liberation Army Navy	patrol boat	166-ton	China
Hai Peng	People's Liberation Army Navy	river gunboat	211-ton	China
Hai Yen	People's Liberation Army Navy	patrol boat	56-ton	China
Hämeenmaa	Finnish Navy	training sloop	400-ton	
Havkatten	Royal Danish Navy	torpedo boat	108-ton	
Havørnen	Royal Danish Navy	torpedo boat and minesweeper	108-ton	
Heimdal	Royal Norwegian Navy	offshore patrol vessel	578-ton	
Hejmdal	Royal Danish Navy	patrol boat	705-ton	became Nerger (Germany)
Henrik Gerner	Royal Danish Navy	submarine tender and minelayer	463-ton	
Henrique Diaz	Brazilian Navy	trawler	680-ton	
Hitra	Royal Norwegian Navy	submarine chaser	125-ton	
Høgen	Royal Danish Navy	torpedo boat	290-ton	became TFA1 (Germany)
Hoi Fu	People's Liberation Army Navy	gunboat	680-ton	China
Honningsvåg	Royal Norwegian Navy	naval trawler	487-ton	
Hsien Ning	People's Liberation Army Navy	gunboat	418-ton	
Hu Ngo	People's Liberation Army Navy	torpedo boat	97-ton	became Kawasemi (Japan)
Hu Peng	People's Liberation Army Navy	torpedo boat	97-ton	China
Hu Tsuin	People's Liberation Army Navy	torpedo boat	97-ton	China
Hu Ying	People's Liberation Army Navy	torpedo boat	97-ton	
Hvalen	Royal Danish Navy	torpedo boat	290-ton	became TFA5 (Germany)
Hvalrossen	Royal Danish Navy	torpedo boat	160-ton	
I				
Incessant	United States Navy	minesweeper	650-ton	
Iguape	Brazilian Navy	minesweeper	150-ton	
Iku-Turso	Finnish Navy	submarine	716-ton	
Ilmatar	Estonian Navy	gunboat		
Islands Falk	Royal Danish Navy	fishery patrol vessel	760-ton	
Itacuruca	Brazilian Navy	mine layer	210-ton	
Itajahy	Brazilian Navy	minesweeper	150-ton	
Itapemirim	Brazilian Navy	mine layer	340-ton	
J				
Jaskółka	Polish Navy	minesweeper	183-ton	
Jen Shen	People's Liberation Army Navy	gunboat	300-ton	
Junín	Colombian National Navy	coast guard vessel	120-ton	
Jurmo	Finnish Navy	tug	400-ton	
K				
Kalanpää	Finnish Navy	minesweeper	52-ton	Ajonpää class
Kalev	Estonian Navy	submarine	834-ton	
Karjala	Finnish Navy	gunboat	342-ton	
Khrabry	Bulgarian Navy	minesweeper	97-ton	
Kiang Chen	People's Liberation Army Navy	gunboat	550-ton	
Kiang Heng	People's Liberation Army Navy	gunboat	550-ton	
Kiang Hsi	People's Liberation Army Navy	gunboat	140-ton	
Kiang Kun	People's Liberation Army Navy	gunboat	140-ton	
Kiang Li	People's Liberation Army Navy	gunboat	550-ton	
Kiang Yuan	People's Liberation Army Navy	gunboat	550-ton	
King	Argentine Navy	gunboat	900-ton	
Kjell	Royal Norwegian Navy	2nd class torpedo boat	84-ton	
King Haakon VII	Royal Norwegian Navy	PC class escort ship	357-ton	
Komendant Piłsudski	Polish Navy	gunboat	342-ton	
Kung Chen	People's Liberation Army Navy	river gunboat	90-ton	
Kvintus	Royal Danish Navy	minelayer	186-ton	became Fürstenburg (Germany)
L				
La Plata	Argentine Navy	destroyer	890-ton	
Laaland	Royal Danish Navy	minelayer	350-ton	
Laine	Estonian Navy	gunboat	211-ton	
Laxen	Royal Danish Navy	torpedo boat	290-ton	became TFA6 (Germany)
Lech	Polish Navy	Tugboat	280-ton	
Lembit	Estonian Navy	submarine	834-ton	
Leopard	Royal Norwegian Navy	torpedo boat	708-ton	former HNoMS Balder (Norway then Germany) returned to Norway 1949, scrapped 1961
Li Chieh	People's Liberation Army Navy	gunboat	266-ton	became Lisui (Japan)
Lieska	Finnish Navy	minelayer	60-ton	
Lindormen	Royal Danish Navy	minelayer	614-ton	became Vs1401 (Germany)
Loimu	Finnish Navy	minelayer	60-ton	
Lossen	Royal Danish Navy	minelayer	628-ton	
Lougen	Royal Danish Navy	minelayer	350-ton	
Louhi	Finnish Navy	minelayer and submarine tender	640-ton	
M				
Maagen	Royal Danish Navy	fishery patrol vessel	110-ton	
Makrelen	Royal Danish Navy	torpedo boat	108-ton	
Maranho	Brazilian Navy	destroyer	934-ton	
Mardus	Estonian Navy	gunboat	80-ton	
Mariscal Sucre	Colombian National Navy	gunboat	125-ton	
Marsuinul	Romanian Naval Forces	submarine	636-ton	
Mato Grosso	Brazilian Navy	destroyer	560-ton	
Mazur	Polish Navy	torpedo boat	340-ton	
Mewa	Polish Navy	minesweeper	183-ton	
Miina	Finnish Navy	mine tender	80-ton	
Ming Chuen	People's Liberation Army Navy	gunboat	465-ton	
Ming Sen	People's Liberation Army Navy	gunboat	465-ton	captured by Japan
MTB 102	Royal Navy	Motor Torpedo Boat	33-ton	
MTB 345	Royal Navy	Motor Torpedo Boat	16.05-ton	UK, then Norway
Murature	Argentine Navy	gunboat	900-ton	
N				
Najaden	Royal Danish Navy	torpedo boat	782-ton	completed 1947
Năluca	Romanian Naval Forces	torpedo boat	266-ton	
Narhvalen	Royal Danish Navy	torpedo boat	108-ton	torpedo boat and minesweeper
Narvi	Finnish Navy		400-ton	
SS Nautilus	Indian Navy	gun boat and coast guard	300 ton	
Nordkaperen	Royal Danish Navy	torpedo boat	108-ton	
Nordkapp	Royal Norwegian Navy	fishery protection vessel	275-ton	
Nymphen	Royal Danish Navy	torpedo boat	782-ton	completed 1947
O				
Ørnen	Royal Danish Navy	torpedo boat	290-ton	became TFA2 (Germany)
Otra	Royal Norwegian Navy	minesweeper	355-ton	
Olive Cam	Royal Australian Navy	auxiliary minesweeper	281-ton	

- Panay (USA): 474-ton river gunboat, sunk 12 December 1937
- Paraguacu (Brazil): 430-ton river monitor
- Parnaiba (Brazil): 620-ton river monitor
- Paukku (Finland): 60-ton minelayer
- Pernambuco (Brazil): 470-ton river monitor
- Pichincha (Colombia): 120-ton coast guard vessel, class of 3
- Pikker (Estonia): 500-ton gunboat, became Kiev (USSR) and later Luga (USSR)
- Pol III (Norway): 214-ton guard vessel
- Pommi (Finland): 80-ton mine tender
- Porkala (Finland): 162-ton minesweeper
- Prezidentas Smetona (Lithuania): 526-ton gunboat, became Pirmūnas and later Korall (USSR) and T-33 (USSR)
- Pukkio (Finland): 162-ton minesweeper

- Quidora (Chile): 435-ton submarine

- Rauma (Norway): 355-ton minesweeper
- Rautu (Finland): 165-ton minesweeper
- Rechinul (Romania): 585-ton submarine
- Reiher (Germany): 109-ton training vessel, ex-West Diep (Belgium), became Warendorp
- Riilahti (Finland): 310-ton minelayer and antisubmarine escort
- Rio Pardo (Brazil): 132-ton submarine chaser
- Ristna (Estonia): 500-ton sidewheeler minelayer
- Rucamilla (Chile): 435-ton submarine
- Ruotsinsalmi (Finland): 310-ton minelayer and antisubmarine escort
- Rybitwa (Poland): 183-ton minesweeper
- Ryś (Poland): 980-ton submarine

- Sæl (Norway): 107-ton 1. class torpedo boat
- Sælen (Denmark): 108-ton torpedo boat
- Salta (Argentina): 920-ton submarine
- Santa Fe (Argentina): 920-ton submarine
- Santa Marta (Colombia): 142-ton gunboat
- Santiago del Estero (Argentina): 920-ton submarine
- Saranda (Albania): 46-ton patrol boat
- Saukko (Finland): 142-ton submarine
- Sborul (Romania): 262-ton torpedo boat
- Shu Shen (China): 380-ton gunboat
- Siofuk (Austria): 50-ton patrol boat, became the Birago (Germany)
- Sixtus (Denmark): 186-ton minelayer
- Smely (Bulgaria): 97-ton torpedo boat and minesweeper
- Smeul (Romania): 266-ton torpedo boat
- Smok (Poland): 711-ton tugboat
- Søhunden (Denmark): 108-ton torpedo boat and minesweeper
- Søridderen (Denmark): 108-ton torpedo boat and minesweeper, became Hajen (Germany)
- Springeren (Denmark): 108-ton torpedo boat and minesweeper
- Støren (Denmark): 108-ton torpedo boat and minesweeper
- Storm (Norway): 107-ton torpedo boat
- Strogi (Bulgaria): 97-ton torpedo boat and minesweeper
- Sublocotenent Ghiculescu (Romania): 344-ton ASW gunboat
- Sulev (Estonia): 228-ton torpedo boat, became Ametist (USSR)
- Suurop (Estonia): 500-ton sidewheeler minelayer and minesweeper

- Ta Tung (China): 900-ton patrol boat
- Taara (Estonia): gunboat
- Tamoyo (Brazil): 844-ton submarine, ex-Ascianghi (Italy)
- Tartu (Estonia): 108-ton gunboat
- Tegualda (Chile): 435-ton submarine
- Teh Sheng (China): 932-ton gunboat, scuttled 1937
- Ternen (Denmark): 100-ton surveying tender and patrol boat
- Tymbira (Brazil): 844-ton submarine, ex-Gondar (Italy)
- Tirane (Albania): 46-ton patrol boat
- Thorodd (Norway): 406-ton patrol boat
- Tse Chiang (China): 900-ton patrol boat
- Tung An (China): 390-ton destroyer
- Tupy (Brazil): 844-ton submarine, ex-Neghelli (Italy)
- Tursas (Finland): 360-ton trawler
- Turunmaa (Finland): 342-ton gunboat
- Uisko (Finland): 360-ton trawler
- Uruguay (Argentina): 550-ton sloop
- Uku (Estonia): Gunboat
- Uusimaa (Finland): 400-ton gunboat

- Veinti y Cuatro de Febrero (Cuba): 218-ton gunboat
- Vesihiisi (Finland): 716-ton submarine
- Vesikko (Finland): 300-ton submarine
- Vetehinen (Finland): 716-ton submarine
- Vidar (Norway): 260-ton minelayer
- Vilppula (Finland): 165-ton minesweeper
- Viraitis (Latvia): 586-ton gunboat and minesweeper, became T-297 (USSR)
- Vlorë (Albania): 46-ton patrol boat

- Wakakura (New Zealand): 540-ton Castle class naval trawler
- Warendorp (Germany): 109-ton training vessel, ex-Reiher
- Wei Sheng (China): 932-ton gunboat, scuttled in 1937
- West Diep (Belgium): 109-ton torpedo boat, became Reiher (Germany)
- Wielingen (Belgium): 227-ton torpedo boat
- Wilk (Poland) 980-ton submarine
- Wu Feng (China): 200-ton gunboat

- Yi Shen (China): 350-ton gunboat
- YP-19 (USA), 37.5-ton patrol vessel
- Yung An (China): 90-ton river gunboat
- Yung Chi (China): 860-ton gunboat, became Hai Hsing (Japan)
- Yung Chien (China): 860-ton gunboat, became Asuka (Japan)
- Yung Feng (China): 780-ton gunboat, became Chung Shan
- Yung Hsiang (China): 780-ton gunboat
- Yung Shen (China): 300-ton gunboat
- Yung Sui (China): 650-ton river gunboat

- Żbik (Poland) 980-ton submarine
- Żuraw (Poland) 183-ton minesweeper
