= Chilean submarine Rucumilla =

1915 Chilean submarine

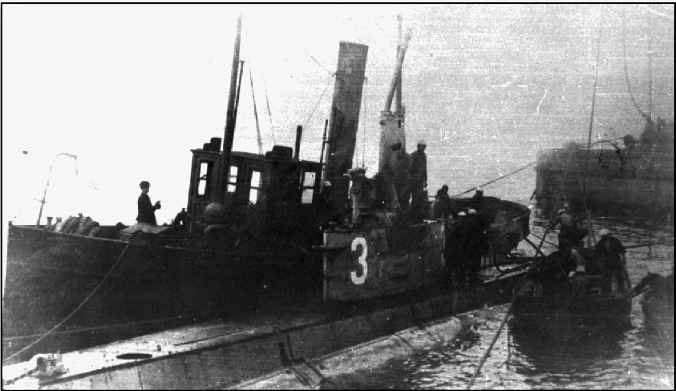
- Rucumilla after the rescue

History

Chile
- Name: H3 (1917–1924); Rucumilla (1924–1945)
- Builder: Fore River Yard, Quincy, Massachusetts
- Launched: 26 July 1915
- Acquired: 1917
- Out of service: Sunk and refloated on 2 June 1919
- Stricken: 1945

General characteristics
- Class & type: H-class submarine
- Displacement: 364 long tons (370 t) surfaced; 434 long tons (441 t) submerged
- Length: 150 ft 3 in (45.80 m)
- Beam: 15 ft 4 in (4.67 m)
- Propulsion: 1 × 480 hp (358 kW) diesel engine; 2 × 620 hp (462 kW) electric motors
- Speed: 13 knots (24 km/h; 15 mph) surfaced; 10 knots (19 km/h; 12 mph) submerged
- Range: 1,600 nmi (3,000 km) at 10 kn (19 km/h; 12 mph) surfaced; 130 nmi (240 km) at 2 kn (3.7 km/h; 2.3 mph) submerged
- Complement: 22
- Armament: 4 × 18 in (457 mm) bow torpedo tubes; 8 × 18 inch torpedoes

Rucumilla was an H-class submarine of the Chilean Navy. The vessel was originally ordered by the United Kingdom's Royal Navy as HMS H17, but was handed over to Chile in 1917 as H3.

== Career ==
H17 was a H-class submarine built by Fore River Yard of Quincy, Massachusetts. She was launched on 26 July 1915. Because the United States was neutral (having not yet entered World War I), H17 along with sister ships H11, H12, H13, H14, H15, H16, H18, H19, and H20 were all interned by the United States government. As a result, H17 was never commissioned into the Royal Navy. Instead, she and H13, H16, H18, H19, and H20 were transferred to the Chilean Navy as partial recompensation for the appropriation of two 28,000-ton dreadnoughts (Almirante Latorre and Almirante Cochrane). Originally named H3 when turned over to Chile in 1917, she was renamed Rucumilla in 1924.

=== Training accident ===
On 2 June 1919 Rucumilla began a naval exercise near of the Talcahuano Naval Base, under the command of Capitán de Corbeta Arístides Del Solar Morel. As she began to submerge into the water, a valve for the battery ventilator was left open and allowed the boat to flood. She sank at 9:45 AM under the strain of the still in rushing water to the seafloor at a depth of 16 metres (52 ft). The escort Contreras (1896) contacted immediately the authorities and the Chilean Navy reacted by sending three heavy lift cranes and other salvage ships for a rescue operation.

The batteries were submerged in sea water and chlorine gas was beginning to fill the boat, short circuits caused small fires and the boat was in complete darkness. Captain Del Solar led the crew to the forward torpedo room, where he believed the rescue would come from and used compressed air, in prudent quantities, to keep the air nearly breathable.

A submarine communication buoy was released by Rucumilla, but it was not freed because of the inclination of the submarine. Divers of the Navy could free the buoy and heavier cables were attached to the bow of the boat.

At 14:00 the largest cranes (180, 60 and 30 t) were moved into position and slowly Rucumilla and her twenty five survivors began to rise. The cables, while under great strain, held and at 17:00, seven hours after she had gone down, the bow of Rucumilla broke the surface.

The probe of the accident found that a valve with a rare left hand thread type caused confusion among the crew.

The operation was a complete success recovering the twenty five men alive and the boat as well.

=== Naval Mutiny 1931 ===
During the mutiny, the officers of Rucumilla tried to attack the mutineers' ships. Near the Quiriquina Island Rucumilla was chased by the tug Colo Colo and eventually was forced to withdraw to the Bío Bío River.

She served with the Chilean Navy until she was stricken in 1945.
