= HMCS CC-2 =

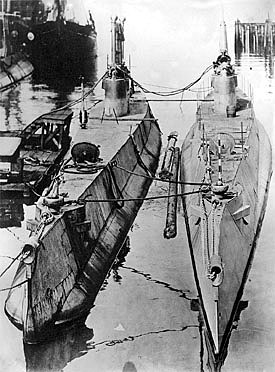
- CC-1 and CC-2

History

Chile
- Name: Antofagasta
- Builder: Seattle Construction and Drydock Company, Seattle
- Launched: 31 December 1913
- Fate: Not accepted, sold to Canada by builder

Canada
- Name: CC-2
- Acquired: 4 August 1914
- Commissioned: 6 August 1914
- Decommissioned: 1920
- Fate: Broken up 1925

General characteristics
- Class & type: CC-class submarine
- Displacement: 310 long tons (315 t) surfaced; 373 long tons (379 t) submerged
- Length: 157.5 ft (48.0 m)
- Beam: 15 ft (4.6 m)
- Draught: 11 ft (3.4 m)
- Propulsion: MAN 6-cylinder diesel engines
- Speed: 13 knots (24 km/h; 15 mph) surfaced; 10 knots (19 km/h; 12 mph) submerged
- Test depth: 200 ft (61 m)
- Complement: 18
- Armament: 3 × 18 in (457 mm) torpedo tubes

HMCS CC-2 was a CC-class submarine used by the Royal Canadian Navy. The ship was launched in 1913 in Seattle, Washington as the submarine Antofagasta for Chile. This deal fell through and the boat, along with HMCS CC-1, was offered to British Columbia's premier Sir Richard McBride, just nine days before the United Kingdom's declaration of war in 1914. On 4 August 1914, the day war was declared, the boat departed at night (to maintain secrecy from the Chilean, German, and U.S. governments) for handover to British Columbia authorities near Victoria, British Columbia. The Dominion Government of Canada later ratified the sale although there was a Parliamentary investigation of the cost of both boats, over twice the annual budget for the entire Royal Canadian Navy in 1913–14. CC-2 served in the Royal Canadian Navy from 1914 to 1920, when the submarine was discarded and broken up in 1925.

== Design ==
The two submarines of the CC class were not identical, with the Electric Boat Company employed two separate designs with the same internal machinery for the submarines. CC-1 was built to the design 19E and CC-2 was built to design 19B. CC-2 was armed with three torpedo tubes of the same size, two forward and one astern. This gave CC-2 a tapered bow. Both submarines used Whitehead Mk IV 18-inch (460 mm) torpedoes that had a range of 1,000 yd (910 m) at 25 kn (46 km/h; 29 mph). The only source for these torpedoes in Canada was HMCS Niobe's stock and it took some time before they were shipped to the submarines.

CC-2 displaced 310 long tons (310 t) surfaced and 373 long tons (379 t) submerged and had a length of 157.5 ft (48.0 m), a beam of 15 ft (4.6 m) and a draught of 11 ft (3.4 m). The boats could dive 200 ft (61 m) and unlike modern submarines, the main ballast and trim tanks were located internally. The boats were powered by MAN 6-cylinder diesel engines constructed in the United States under licence. The CC class could carry 5,356 US gal (20,270 L) of diesel fuel. The two submarines were designed to make 13 knots (24 km/h; 15 mph) surfaced and 10 knots (19 km/h; 12 mph) submerged. CC-2 had a complement of two officers and sixteen ratings.

== Construction and acquisition ==
Ordered by the Chilean government from the Electric Boat Company, the submarine was constructed on the east coast, broken down into component parts and shipped across the country to Seattle to be reassembled by the Seattle Construction and Drydock Company. Named Antofagasta, the submarine was launched on 31 December 1913. The deal with Chile fell through after the Chilean government grew unhappy with the submarine's capability. After meeting with Canadian officials in Victoria, British Columbia, a planned was hatched to sell the submarines to Canada. Sir Richard McBride, the Premier of British Columbia did not wait for approval of the deal from the national government in Ottawa and authorized the purchase of the submarines.

On 3 August 1914, Antofagasta and sister boat Iquique left Seattle in secrecy and sailed for Canada. Meeting British Columbia officials outside Canadian waters, the transfer was made with British Columbia paying $1.15 million for the two submarines. The two subs were taken to British Columbia to await federal approval of the deal. On 7 August, the Government of Canada passed an Order in Council assuming responsibility for and purchasing the two warships from British Columbia, the only province of Canada to have owned warships. In keeping with an earlier Australian practice when two British E-class submarines had been renamed AE 1 and AE 2 by adding the "A" in front of the class to denote Australia, the two submarines purchased by Canada, resembling British C-class submarines, had two "C"s placed in front of their names to denote Canada and their apparent class.

The acquisition of the submarines faced serious scrutiny, undergoing a Royal Commission and investigation. The submarines faced criticism from Royal Navy experts and even the Electric Boat Company. However, the Royal Commission later found in favour of the decision to acquire the submarines.

== Service history ==
Commissioned on 6 August 1914 as CC-2, the submarine was assigned to the west coast in the home port of Esquimalt, British Columbia, and conducted training operations and patrols for three years. Together with the cruiser HMCS Rainbow, CC-1 and CC-2 were the only Canadian or British ships defending the west coast of Canada between 1914 and 1917. Under the Anglo-Japanese alliance Britain left the defence of British Columbia to the Imperial Japanese Navy's North American Task Force.

In 1917 the submarine was transferred to the east coast with CC-1 and the submarine tender Shearwater. On 21 June 1917 the three vessels left Esquimalt. Off Cape Blanco, the fleet ran into a gale and CC-2 rolled heavily in the seas, seawater contaminating the sub's batteries. Half the crew was incapacitated by chlorine gas. The high seas also caused the propellers on both the submarines to be tossed out of the water, in turn causing the engines to over-rev. The stabilisation of this problem later caused the battery cells to start to break down and eventually short-circuit and start electrical fires. The electrical fires led the crews to only operate one diesel engine at a time, as the other was usually under repair. CC-2 worked until San Francisco and then both submarines were towed to San Diego. Confined to port-hopping down the coast and passing through the Canal Zone, the fleet had to stop at Kingston, Jamaica to make repairs. The group's transit through the Panama Canal was the first time a warship transited the Panama Canal under the White Ensign.

Moving on from Kingston, the three ships spent five days at Charleston, South Carolina making more repairs. The fleet attempted to set out, but returned to Charleston for more repairs. They left again and hit a storm, the fleet limping into Norfolk, Virginia, where the submarines spent two weeks in the US Navy dockyard. The group arrived at Halifax, Nova Scotia on 17 October 1917 for preparation to send the two subs to the Mediterranean and Europe.

Following their arrival at Halifax, it was found that the two submarines both need an engine overhaul and that neither would be available until mid-August 1918. Only after the Admiralty was informed of their dire condition did they rescind that order and then ordered them for use as coastal defence on the east coast. CC-2 was then held in Halifax as a Training Assistance Boat, training surface vessels in anti-submarine warfare. The sub finished the war as a training vessel, not going on patrol again before the Armistice.

Following the war, the Royal Navy transferred the H-class submarines H14 and H15 to Canada. The Royal Canadian Navy could not operate both the H class and the CC class, so the decision was made to place the CC class in reserve. The two submarines were put up for sale in 1920 and were packaged with Niobe for disposal. The three vessels were sold for scrap in 1925 and broken up.
