= Chilean submarine Guale =

Chilean submarine

History

Chile
- Name: H4
- Builder: Fore River Yard, Quincy, Massachusetts
- Launched: 26 July 1915
- Acquired: 1917
- Renamed: Guale, 1924
- Stricken: 1945

General characteristics
- Class & type: H-class submarine
- Displacement: 364 long tons (370 t) surfaced; 434 long tons (441 t) submerged
- Length: 150 ft 9 in (45.9 m)
- Beam: 15 ft 9 in (4.8 m)
- Draught: 12 ft 4 in (3.8 m)
- Propulsion: 1 × 480 bhp (358 kW) diesel engine; 2 × 640 hp (477 kW) electric motors
- Speed: 13 knots (24 km/h; 15 mph) surfaced; 10 knots (19 km/h; 12 mph) submerged
- Range: 2,800 nmi (5,200 km; 3,200 mi) at 11 kn (20 km/h; 13 mph) surfaced; 30 nmi (56 km; 35 mi) at 5 kn (9.3 km/h; 5.8 mph) submerged
- Complement: 22
- Armament: 4 × 18 in (457 mm) bow torpedo tubes; 8 × 18-inch torpedoes

The Chilean submarine Guale was an H-class submarine of the Chilean Navy. The vessel was originally ordered by the United Kingdom's Royal Navy as HMS H18, but was handed over to Chile in 1917 as H4.

== Description ==
Guale was a single-hulled submarine, with a pressure hull divided into five watertight compartments. The submarine had a length of 150 feet 9 inches (45.9 m) overall, a beam of 15 feet 9 inches (4.8 m) and a draft of 12 feet 4 inches (3.8 m). She displaced 363 long tons (369 t) on the surface and 434 long tons (441 t) submerged. The H-class submarines had a crew of 22 officers and enlisted men.

The submarine had two propellers, each of which was driven by a 240-horsepower (180 kW) diesel engine as well as a 320-horsepower (239 kW) electric motors. This arrangement gave Guale a maximum speed of 13 knots (24 km/h; 15 mph) while surfaced and 10.5 knots (19.4 km/h; 12.1 mph) submerged. She had a range of 1,750 nmi (3,240 km; 2,010 mi) at 7 knots (13 km/h; 8.1 mph) while on the surface and 30 nmi (56 km; 35 mi) at 5 kn (9.3 km/h; 5.8 mph) while submerged. The boat had a capacity of 17.5 long tons (17.8 t) of fuel oil. The H-class submarines were equipped with four 18-inch (457 mm) torpedo tubes in the bow and carried eight torpedoes.

== Career ==
H18 was a H-class submarine built by Fore River Yard of Quincy, Massachusetts. She was launched on 14 August 1915. Because the United States was neutral (having not yet entered World War I), H18 along with sister ships H11, H12, H13, H14, H15, H16, H17, H19, and H20 were all interned by the United States government. As a result, H18 was never commissioned into the Royal Navy. Instead, she and H13, H16, H17, H19, and H20 were transferred to the Chilean Navy as partial recompensation for the appropriation of two 28,000-ton dreadnoughts (Almirante Latorre and Almirante Cochrane). Originally named H4 when turned over to Chile in 1917, she was renamed Guale in 1924. She served with the Chilean Navy until she was stricken in 1945.

== See also ==
- List of submarines of the Second World War
