= HMCS CC-1 =

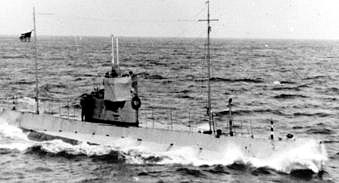
- HMCS CC-1 underway on surface

History

Canada
- Name: CC-1
- Builder: Seattle Construction and Drydock Company
- Launched: 3 June 1913
- Acquired: 4 August 1914
- Commissioned: 6 August 1914
- Fate: Paid off in 1920, broken up 1925

General characteristics
- Type: CC-class submarine
- Displacement: 313 long tons (318 t) surfaced; 373 long tons (379 t) submerged
- Length: 144 ft (44 m)
- Beam: 15 ft (4.6 m)
- Draught: 11 ft (3.4 m)
- Propulsion: MAN 6-cylinder diesel engine
- Speed: 13 knots (24 km/h; 15 mph)
- Test depth: 200 ft (61 m)
- Complement: 18 (2 officers, 16 enlisted)
- Armament: 5 × 18 in (457 mm) torpedo tubes

HMCS CC-1 was a CC-class submarine used by the Royal Canadian Navy. Acquired by British Columbia at the outbreak of the First World War, the ship had been initially built for Chile as Iquique. However, after a dispute with the shipyard, Chile refused the submarine and the shipyard owners sold the vessel to Canada instead. Renamed CC-1 in Canadian service, the vessel was commissioned in 1914 and remained active through the war. Following the war, the submarine was laid up and was discarded in 1920.

== Design and description ==
Differing from her sister boat, CC-2, CC-1 was built to the design 19E. The layout of the torpedo tubes within the boats led to different hull forms. CC-1 was armed with five 18 in (460 mm) torpedo tubes, four forward and one astern. This gave the submarine a bluff bow shape. The submarine used Whitehead Mk IV 18-inch (460 mm) torpedoes that had a range of 1,000 yd (910 m) at 25 kn (46 km/h; 29 mph). The only source for these torpedoes in Canada was HMCS Niobe's stock and it took some time before they were shipped to the submarines.

CC-1 displaced 313 long tons (318 t) surfaced and 373 long tons (379 t) submerged and had a length of 144.5 ft (44.0 m), a beam of 15 ft (4.6 m) and a draught of 11 ft (3.4 m). The boats could dive 200 ft (61 m) and unlike modern submarines, the main ballast and trim tanks were located internally. The boats were powered by MAN 6-cylinder diesel engines constructed in the United States under licence. The CC class could carry 5,356 US gal (20,270 L) of diesel fuel. The two submarines were designed to make 13 knots (24 km/h; 15 mph) surfaced and 10 knots (19 km/h; 12 mph) submerged, however CC-1 made 15 knots (28 km/h; 17 mph) in sea trials in November 1917. The submarine had a complement of 2 officers and 16 enlisted.

== Construction and acquisition ==
Constructed by the Seattle Construction and Drydock Company, the submarine was launched on 3 March 1913 at Seattle, Washington as the submarine Iquique for Chile. This deal fell through and the boat, along with CC-2, was offered to British Columbia's premier Sir Richard McBride, just nine days before the declaration of war in 1914. On 4 August 1914, the day the United Kingdom declared war on Germany, the boat departed at night (to maintain secrecy from the Chilean, German, and U.S. governments) for handover to British Columbian authorities near Victoria. The Dominion Government of Canada later ratified the sale although there was a Parliamentary investigation of the cost of both boats. The submarine entered into service for the Royal Canadian Navy as CC-1 on 6 August 1914.

== Royal Canadian Navy service ==
The submarine was assigned to the west coast in the home port of Esquimalt, British Columbia, and conducted training operations and patrols for three years. Together with HMCS Rainbow, CC-1 and CC-2 were the only Canadian warships defending the west coast of Canada between 1914 and 1917. Britain had tasked the defence of British Columbia to the Imperial Japanese Navy's North American Task Force.

In 1917, the submarine was transferred to the east coast along with CC-2 and the submarine tender HMCS Shearwater. Their transit through the Panama Canal was the first time a Canadian or British warship traversed the Panama Canal under the White Ensign. They arrived at Halifax, Nova Scotia for preparation to send the two subs to Europe. Deemed unsafe for transatlantic crossing, CC-1 was held in Halifax for coastal defence. While under repair at Halifax, the two submarines survived the Halifax Explosion unscathed. The Royal Canadian Navy then devised a plan to utilise the two subs in anti-submarine training for the surface vessels. The two subs finished the war as training vessels, not going on patrol again before the Armistice.

Following the war, the Royal Navy transferred the H-class submarines H14 and H15 to Canada. The Royal Canadian Navy could not operate both the H class and the CC class, so the decision was made to place the CC class in reserve. The two ships were put up for sale in 1920 and were packaged with Niobe for disposal. The three ships were discarded in 1925.

== Sources ==
- Colledge, J. J.; Warlow, Ben (2006) [1969]. Ships of the Royal Navy: The Complete Record of All Fighting Ships of the Royal Navy from the 15th Century to the Present (3rd Rev ed.). London: Chatham Publishing. ISBN 978-1-86176-281-8. OCLC 67375475.
- Ferguson, Julie H. (2014). Through a Canadian Periscope: The Story of the Canadian Submarine Service. Toronto: Dundurn Press. ISBN 978-1-55002-217-9.
- Johnston, William; Rawling, William G.P.; Gimblett, Richard H.; MacFarlane, John (2010). The Seabound Coast: The Official History of the Royal Canadian Navy, 1867–1939. Vol. 1. Toronto: Dundurn Press. ISBN 978-1-55488-908-2.
- Macpherson, Ken; Barrie, Ron (2002). The Ships of Canada's Naval Forces 1910–2002 (Third ed.). St. Catharines, Ontario: Vanwell Publishing. ISBN 1-55125-072-1.
- Perkins, Dave (1989). Canada's Submariners 1914–1923. Erin, Ontario: Boston Mills Press. ISBN 1-55046-014-5.
