= H18 =

H18 may refer to:

- Pushpalal Highway or Mid-hill Highway, a highway in mid-hilly region of Nepal
- British NVC community H18, a heath in the British National Vegetation Classification system
- HMS H18, an H-class submarine ordered by but never commissioned into the Royal Navy
- HMS Sabre (H18), a Royal Navy S-class destroyer
- London Buses routes H18, a Transport for London contracted bus route
- Sikorsky H-18, an American helicopter
- Tomakomai Station, in Hokkaido, Japan
