= HMAS Olive Cam =

World War II Royal Australian Navy minesweeper

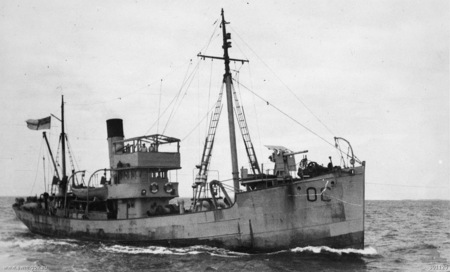
- HMAS Olive Cam

History
- Name: Nodzu (1920-1929); Olive Cam (1929-1954)
- Owner: Neale & West, Fish Merchants, Cardiff, Wales (1920-1928) T.A. Field, Sydney, Australia (1928-1929) Cam & Sons Ltd, Sydney, Australia (1929-1940)
- Builder: Cook, Welton & Gemmell, Beverley, Yorkshire, UK (Yard No. 437)
- Launched: 30 September 1920
- Completed: December 1920
- In service: 14 December 1920

History

Australia
- Name: Olive Cam
- Acquired: 18 September 1939
- Commissioned: 6 October 1939
- Decommissioned: 14 November 1945
- Identification: FY76
- Fate: Returned to owner on 24 April 1946

General characteristics
- Tonnage: 281 gross register tonnage
- Length: 128.5 ft (39 m)
- Beam: 23.5 ft (7 m)
- Depth: 12.6 ft (4 m)
- Armament: 1 × 12-pounder gun; 1 × 20mm Oerlikon cannon; 1 × .303-inch Vickers machine gun

HMAS Olive Cam was an auxiliary minesweeper operated by the Royal Australian Navy (RAN) during World War II. She was launched in 1920 by Cook, Welton & Gemmell at Beverley as Nodzu. The ship operated in Australian waters from 1929, and was requisitioned by the RAN on 18 September 1939. She was returned to her owners on 24 April 1946, before being wrecked near Green Cape Lighthouse, Eden, New South Wales on 2 November 1954 with the loss of three lives.

== Operational history ==
Originally built for use as a fishing trawler off Wales, Nodzu was purchased by T.A Field and sailed to Sydney, Australia in 1928. She was then purchased by Cam & Sons Ltd in February 1929 and was renamed Olive Cam.

In September 1939, Olive Cam was requisitioned by the RAN for use as an auxiliary and commissioned on 6 October 1939.

During the war, Olive Cam was based in Fremantle with Minesweeping Group 66 and operated along the West Australian coastline. She was part of the search for HMAS Sydney which was lost on 19 November 1941. Following her decommissioning on 14 November 1945, she was returned to her owners on 24 April 1946.

On 2 November 1954, she was wrecked 37.151107°S 150.007120°E near Green Cape Lighthouse, Eden, New South Wales, causing the deaths of three of her crewmen.

== See also ==
- list of auxiliary ships of World War II
- list of World War II ships of less than 1000 tons
