= CC-class submarine =

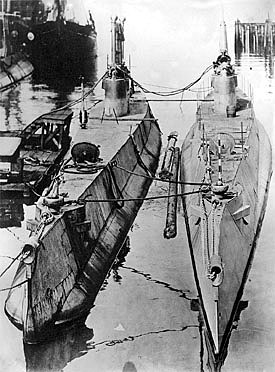
- HMCS CC-1 and HMCS CC-2

Class overview
- Name: CC class
- Builders: Seattle Construction and Drydock Company
- Operators: Royal Canadian Navy
- Preceded by: None
- Succeeded by: H class
- Built: 1913
- In commission: 1914–1920
- Completed: 2
- Scrapped: 2

General characteristics
- Type: Submarine
- Displacement: 313 long tons (318 t) surfaced; 373 long tons (379 t) submerged
- Length: 144 ft (44 m)
- Beam: 15 ft (4.6 m)
- Draught: 11 ft (3.4 m)
- Propulsion: MAN 6-cylinder diesel engine
- Speed: 13 knots (24 km/h; 15 mph)
- Test depth: 200 ft (61 m)
- Complement: 18 (2 officers, 16 enlisted)
- Armament: 5 × 18 in (457 mm) torpedo tubes firing Whitehead Mark IV

The CC-class submarine was the first class of submarines used by the Royal Canadian Navy. Designed as diesel-electric submarines for use as coastal defence, they were originally purchased by the province of British Columbia from a shipbuilder in Seattle, Washington, which had built the submarines for the Chilean Navy. Acquired by Canada they saw no battle while in service during the First World War and were paid off in 1920. They were the first Canadian warships to pass through the Panama Canal. Both ships were discarded in 1925.

== Design ==
The two submarines were not identical. The design called for diesel-electric submarines for use as coastal defence. However, the Electric Boat Company employed two separate designs with the same internal machinery for the submarines. CC-1 was built to the design 19E and CC-2 was built to design 19B. The layout of the torpedo tubes within the boats led to different hull forms. CC-1 was armed with five 18 in (460 mm) torpedo tubes, four forward and one astern. This gave the submarine a bluff bow shape. CC-2 was armed with three torpedo tubes of the same size, two forward and one astern. This gave CC-2 a tapered bow. Both ships used Whitehead Mk IV 18-inch (460 mm) torpedoes that had a range of 1,000 yd (910 m) at 25 kn (46 km/h; 29 mph). The only source for these torpedoes in Canada was HMCS Niobe's stock and it took some time before they were shipped to the submarines.

Due to their different designs, the two submarines had different measurements. CC-1 displaced 313 tons and had a length of 144.5 ft (44.0 m), a beam of 15 ft (4.6 m) and a draught of 11 ft (3.4 m). CC-2 displaced 310 tons, had a length of 157.5 ft (48.0 m), a beam of 15 ft (4.6 m) and a draught of 11 ft (3.4 m).

The boats could dive 200 ft (61 m) and unlike modern submarines, the main ballast and trim tanks were located internally. The boats were powered by MAN 6-cylinder diesel engines constructed in the United States under licence. The CC class could carry 5,356 US gal (20,270 L) of diesel fuel. The two submarines were designed to make 13 knots (24 km/h; 15 mph) surfaced and 10 knots (19 km/h; 12 mph) submerged, however CC-1 made 15 knots (28 km/h; 17 mph) in sea trials in November 1917.

== Origin ==
An order for two submarines had originally been placed by Chile in 1911 with the Electric Boat Company of New Jersey. The order was subcontracted to Seattle Construction and Drydock Company for a total of $818,000. The Electric Boat Company then designed and built a boat in a way that could be taken apart and shipped across country to Seattle to be assembled. After sea trials, the submarines now named Iquique and Antofogasta were refused by the Chilean officials as they had failed to achieve the radius of action demanded in the contract. At the same time, Chile had allowed its progress payments to fall in arrears. This led the Seattle shipbuilding company to find ways to get rid of the submarines.

During a meeting of citizens in Victoria, British Columbia in the buildup to the First World War, J.V. Paterson, the president of the Seattle Construction and Drydock Company, revealed that his firm was willing to sell the two submarines that had recently been completed. This was brought to the attention of Sir Richard McBride, premier of British Columbia. After speaking with several local stakeholders, McBride informed the Government of Canada and the Naval Service (Royal Canadian Navy) that there were two submarines for sale and that they should purchase them for the offered price of $575,000 each. While awaiting their response, McBride agreed to buy the submarines using funds from the government of British Columbia.

On the eve of the First World War, the two submarines left Seattle at 2200 hours on 3 August 1914, sneaking out of harbour as the clearance papers for the two boats had not been obtained at the time. They sailed to meet the tugboat SS Salvor outside Canadian waters. At that point, on 4 August 1914, the payment of $1.15 million was made for the two boats.

The next day, the United States Navy dispatched the cruiser USS Milwaukee to search for the submarines, however by the time the ship reached the area where they had been, the two boats were gone. On 7 August, the Government of Canada passed an Order in Council assuming responsibility for and purchasing the two warships from British Columbia, the only province of Canada to have owned warships. In keeping with an earlier Australian practice when two British E-class submarines had been renamed AE 1 and AE 2 by adding the "A" in front of the class to denote Australia, the two submarines purchased by Canada, resembling British C-class submarines, had two "C"s placed in front of their names to denote Canada and their apparent class.

=== Criticism of purchase ===
Led by former minister William Pugsley, there was an divergence of opinion concerning the purchase of the submarines. Initially heralded by Prime Minister Robert Borden as a masterstroke, rumours began to circulate about problems developing on the submarines and the exorbitant cost the Government of British Columbia, and then Canada, had paid and that Paterson, the president of Seattle Construction, had pocketed a large commission. These rumours led to the submarine purchase being investigated by a Royal Commission into dubious war purchases.

The Royal Commission headed by Sir Charles Davidson, heard from Philip Watts, the former director of naval construction for the Royal Navy and advisor to the Chilean government regarding the initial design of the submarines, through his letter to the Admiralty during the initial process of acquisition. His assessment was that the boats had been built too heavy. Electric Boat Company had admitted to that the submarines had displayed dangerous diving characteristics and had been in the process of developing alterations to the design when the ships were purchased by the Canadian government. The neutrality of the United States had prevented them from having any further involvement once war had been declared.

When Electric Boat Company testified, they gave truth to the rumours that Paterson had made a profit off the boats, the sale price they had provided Paterson when he requested the information from the parent company had been lower. The defence of the decision lay in the timing of the deal, the eventual US neutrality, and the Admiralty recommendation to purchase the boats when they had been informed. These three points swayed the Royal Commission in finding in favour of McBride's decision.

== Ships ==
Construction data
| Name | Launched | Shipyard | Commissioned | Fate |
|---|---|---|---|---|
| CC-1 (ex-Iquique) | 3 June 1913 | Seattle Construction and Drydock Company, Seattle, Washington | 6 August 1914 | Discarded 1925 |
| CC-2 (ex-Antofagasta) | 31 December 1913 | Seattle Construction and Drydock Company, Seattle, Washington | 6 August 1914 | Discarded 1925 |

== Operational history ==
After commissioning, though without torpedoes, because those had yet to arrive from the east coast, CC-2 was deployed on 13 August 1914 to the Strait of Juan de Fuca as a deterrent to the German raider threat. Later CC-1 joined her as the threat, given form by Admiral Von Spee's Pacific Fleet, increased. However, problems plagued the two boats and they were withdrawn from active service in September 1914 for refit.

With HMS Shearwater as their tender, the two boats were based at Esquimalt, British Columbia. They were called No.1 and No.2 until October 1914 when they officially received their new names CC-1 and CC-2 respectively. Their refit in September and October 1914 was primarily focused on three problems. The first problem was the instability while diving. The boats, especially CC-2, developed uncontrollable negative buoyancy when the ballast tanks were vented. If the tanks were left partially full, the boats would take dangerous nose or tail dives. This required a reduction in weight which led to the removal of all unnecessary stores, fuel and spare parts. This eventually limited the patrol range of the class to only a few days at a time.

The second problem facing the boats was the tendency of the cylinders in the diesel engines to overheat. This problem was never rectified and the cylinders would eventually crack after six hours of running at full speed. This was due to early engine design and metallurgical inadequacies. The third and final problem was temperamental emptying of tanks during diving or surfacing. This was rectified by the refitting of faulty valves. After refitting, the ships performed various patrol and training cruises along the west coast.

=== Transit to east coast ===
In 1916 it was suggested by naval planners to bring the CC-class submarines to the east coast. During 1917 that became a reality as the Admiralty ordered the two subs and Shearwater to Europe. On 21 June 1917 the three ships left Esquimalt. Off Cape Blanco, the fleet ran into a gale and CC-2 rolled heavily in the seas, seawater contaminating the sub's batteries. Half the crew was incapacitated by chlorine gas. The high seas also caused the propellers on both the submarines to be tossed out of the water, in turn causing the engines to over-rev. The stabilisation of this problem later caused the battery cells to start to break down and eventually short-circuit and start electrical fires.

The electrical fires led the crews to only operate one diesel engine at a time, as the other was usually under repair. CC-1 had to be towed from that point onward to San Francisco. CC-2 worked until San Francisco and then both submarines were towed to San Diego. Confined to port-hopping down the coast and passing through the Canal Zone, the fleet had to stop at Kingston, Jamaica to make repairs.

Moving on from Kingston, the three vessels spent five days at Charleston, South Carolina making more repairs. The fleet attempted to set out, but returned to Charleston for more repairs. They left again and hit a storm, the fleet limping into Norfolk, Virginia, where the submarines spent two weeks in the US Navy dockyard. CC-1 was towed by Shearwater to Newport, Rhode Island where after another six days of repair, the fleet set out to finish the transit, arriving at Halifax, Nova Scotia on 17 October 1917.

=== End of service ===
Following their arrival at Halifax, it was found that the two submarines both need an engine overhaul and that neither would be available until mid-August 1918. However, the Admiralty insisted that the submarines be made ready for duty in Europe and ordered them to refuel and proceed to the Mediterranean Sea. Only after the Admiralty was informed of their dire condition did they rescind that order and then ordered them for use as coastal defence on the east coast.

While under repair at Halifax, the two submarines survived the Halifax Explosion unscathed. The Royal Canadian Navy then devised a plan to utilise the two subs in anti-submarine training for the surface vessels. This was done on Cape Breton Island. CC-2 and Shearwater were sent to Bras d'Or Lake and trained the trawler and drifter crews in the use of their hydrophones. The two subs finished the war as training vessels, not going on patrol again before the Armistice.

Following the war, the Royal Navy transferred the H-class submarines H14 and H15 to Canada. The Royal Canadian Navy could not operate both the H class and the CC class, so the decision was made to place the CC class in reserve. The two submarines were put up for sale in 1920 and were packaged with Niobe for disposal. The three vessels were discarded in 1925.
