= List of auxiliary ships of World War II =

World War II naval support vessels

This list of auxiliary vessels of Second World War contains major military vessels of the war, arranged alphabetically and by type. The list includes armed vessels that served during the war and in the immediate aftermath, inclusive of localized ongoing combat operations, garrison surrenders, post-surrender occupation, colony re-occupation, troop and prisoner repatriation, to the end of 1945. For smaller vessels see also list of World War II ships of less than 1000 tons. Some uncompleted Axis ships are included, out of historic interest. Ships are classified by the country under which they operated for the longest period of the Second World War, regardless of where they were built or previous service history.

List of auxiliary ships of World War II
Ship	Country or organization	Class	Type	Displacement (tons)	First commissioned	Fate
Alcantara	Royal Navy		armed merchant cruiser	22,181	1927	Scrapped 1958
Anacapa	United States Navy		Q-ship	7,500	31 August 1942	21 March 1946
Antoine	Royal Navy		Special Service Ship	1,030		paid off March 1941
Asterion	United States Navy		Q-ship	6,610	March 1942	transferred to Coast Guard 16 December 1943 converted to weather ship
Atik	United States Navy		Q-ship	6,610	5 March 1942	sunk 26 March 1942
Atlantis	Kriegsmarine		auxiliary cruiser	7,862	19 December 1939	Sunk 21 November 1941
Big Horn	United States Navy		Q-ship		15 April 1942	6 May 1946
Brutus	Royal Navy		Special Service Ship	5,945		paid off March 1941
Captor	United States Navy		Q-ship	319	5 March 1942	paid off 4 October 1944
Chatsgrove	Royal Navy	P	Special Service Ship	610	1918	paid off March 1941
Coronel	Kriegsmarine		auxiliary cruiser	12,700	13 August 1938	ran aground 21 November 1984
Cyprus	Royal Navy		Special Service Ship	4,398		paid off March 1941
Dunvegan Castle	Royal Navy		armed merchant cruiser	15,007	7 September 1939	sunk 28 August 1940
Edgehill	Royal Navy		Special Service Ship	4,702		sunk 29 June 1940
Fidelity	Royal Navy		Special Service Ship	2,456	24 September 1940	sunk 30 December 1942
Hansa	Kriegsmarine		auxiliary cruiser	9,138	2 February 1944	scrapped 1971
Irene Forsyte	United States Navy		Q-ship	283	26 August 1943	16 December 1943
Jervis Bay	Royal Navy		armed merchant cruiser	14,164	October 1940	sunk 5 November 1940
Komet	Kriegsmarine		auxiliary cruiser	7,500	2 June 1940	sunk 14 October 1942
Kormoran	Kriegsmarine		auxiliary cruiser	19,900	9 October 1940	19 November 1941
Lambridge	Royal Navy		Special Service Ship	5,119		paid off March 1941
Looe	Royal Navy		Special Service Ship	1,030		paid off March 1941
Maunder	Royal Navy		Special Service Ship	5,072		paid off March 1941
Michel	Kriegsmarine		auxiliary cruiser	10,900	7 September 1941	sunk 17 October 1943
Monowai	Royal New Zealand Navy		armed merchant cruiser	4,925	30 August 1940	Decommissioned 18 June 1943, then landing ship
Orion	Kriegsmarine		auxiliary cruiser	15,700	9 December 1939	sunk 4 May 1945
Patroclus	Royal Navy		armed merchant cruiser	11,314	12 September 1939	sunk 4 November 1940
Pinguin	Kriegsmarine		auxiliary cruiser	17,600	6 February 1940	sunk 8 May 1941
Pretoria Castle	Royal Navy		armed merchant cruiser	23,450	28 November 1939	training merchant aircraft carrier from July 1943, reconverted to passenger liner
Prince David	Royal Canadian Navy		armed merchant cruiser	5,736	28 December 1940	Broken up 1951
Prince Henry	Royal Canadian Navy		armed merchant cruiser	6,893	3 November 1940	paid off July 1946
Prince Robert	Royal Canadian Navy		armed merchant cruiser	6,892	December 1940	paid off 10 December 1945
Prunella	Royal Navy		Special Service Ship	4,443		sunk 21 June 1940
Rajputana	Royal Navy		armed merchant cruiser	16,568	December 1939	sunk 13 April 1941
Ramb I	Regia Marina		armed merchant cruiser	3,667	10 June 1940	sunk 27 February 1941
Ramb II	Regia Marina		armed merchant cruiser	3,667	10 June 1940	to Japanese as Calitea II; sunk on 12 January 1945
Ramb III	Regia Marina		armed merchant cruiser	3,667	10 June 1940	to Germany 9 September 1943, then in post-war service with the Yugoslav Navy
Stier	Kriegsmarine		auxiliary cruiser	11,000	25 November 1939	sunk 27 September 1942
Thor	Kriegsmarine		auxiliary cruiser	9,200	15 March 1940	accidentally burnt 30 November 1942
Transylvania	Royal Navy		armed merchant cruiser	16,923	5 October 1939	sunk 10 August 1940
Widder	Kriegsmarine		auxiliary cruiser	16,800	30 November 1939	became repair ship Neumark 1941
