= Reiher =

Reiher is a surname. Notable people with the surname include:

- Alan Reiher (1927–2003), Australian public servant
- Christian Reiher (born 1984), German mathematician
- Darren Reiher (born 1978), American actor
- Hendrik Reiher (born 1962), German rowing cox

Aircraft

- DFS Reiher, a 1937 German glider

Ships

- SS Reiher, at least three ships of this name

== See also ==
- Reimer
