= ORP Smok =

Tugboat of the Polish Navy

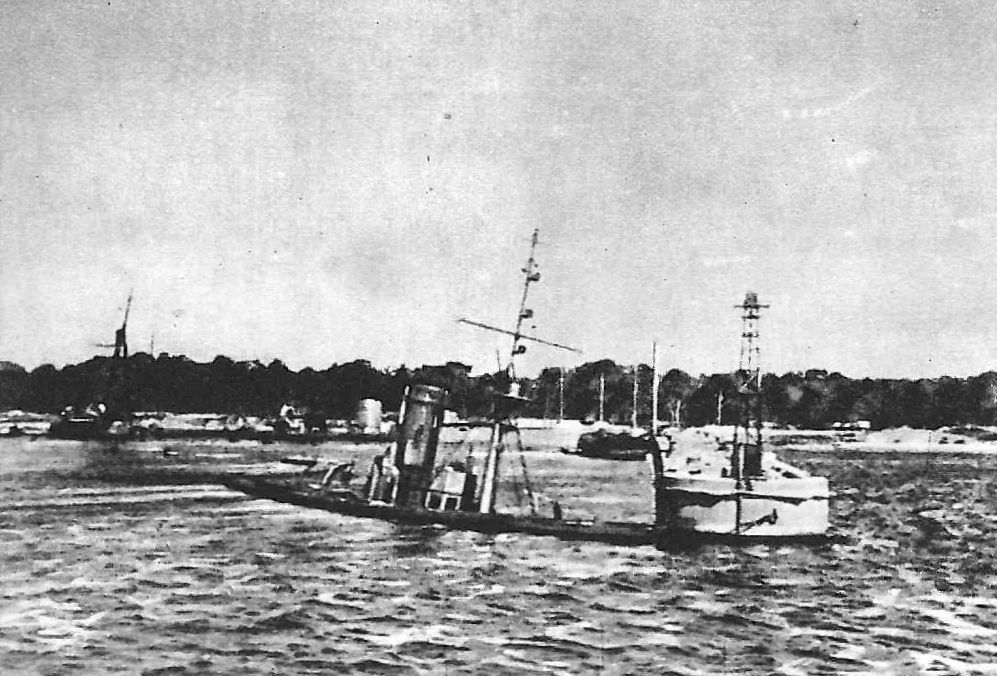
- Wreck of a tugboat in the port of Hel

History

France
- Name: Le Boxeur
- Builder: Compagnie Général de Matérieux in La Rochelle
- Launched: 1922
- Commissioned: 1922

Belgium
- Name: Leopold
- Commissioned: 1930

Poland
- Name: ORP Smok
- Commissioned: November 15, 1932

Nazi Germany
- Name: Rixhöft
- Commissioned: 1940
- Decommissioned: March 2, 1945

General characteristics
- Class & type: Tugboat
- Displacement: 711 t (700 long tons)
- Length: 40.3 m (132 ft 3 in)
- Draft: 3.45 m (11 ft 4 in)
- Propulsion: 1 piston steam engine with a power of 1,200 hp
- Speed: 12.5 kn (23.2 km/h; 14.4 mph)
- Range: 5,000 nmi (9,300 km; 5,800 mi)
- Complement: 2 officers; between 26 and 28 non-commissioned officers and sailors
- Armament: 2 guns, 37 mm caliber; 2 medium machine guns, 7.92 mm caliber, MG 08

ORP Smok was a full-sea tugboat of the Polish Navy, built in 1922 in La Rochelle, France. It sailed under various owners in France and Belgium under the names Le Boxeur and Leopold. Purchased by Poland in 1932, it served as a tugboat, training ship, and auxiliary mine-laying ship. It underwent numerous reconstructions. During the September Campaign, it transported materials from Gdynia to Hel. To block the entrance to the port in Hel, it was scuttled. It was salvaged by the Germans and, after repairs, incorporated into service under the name Rixhöft. It sailed until 1945, when it sank due to an aerial naval mine.

== Construction and description ==
The future Smok was built between 1920 and 1921 at the French shipyard Compagnie Général de Matérieux in La Rochelle as a full-sea tugboat.

The ship had an overall length of 40.3 metres (132 ft 3 in), a maximum width of 9 m (29 ft 6 in), and a draft of 3.5 m (11 ft 6 in) (according to some sources, the vessel measured 40.56 m (133 ft 1 in) long with a beam of 8.56 m (28 ft 1 in) and a draft of 4.27 m (14 ft 0 in)). The displacement of the vessel was 655 t (645 long tons), but after reconstruction in 1938, it increased to 711 t (700 long tons). The hull of the vessel was made of steel. The superstructure was located amidships, with a funnel behind it. A mast with a 75 cm diameter spotlight and a boom with a lifting capacity of 3 t were mounted on the bow. The propulsion system consisted of one water-tube boiler and one compound engine with a power of 1,200 hp (890 kW), which drove a single propeller. The engine power allowed for a maximum speed of 12.5 knots (23.2 km/h; 14.4 mph). The range was 5,000 nautical miles (9,300 km; 5,800 mi).

During its civilian service, the tugboat had a crew of 30 people, whereas in the navy, at various times, the crew consisted of 2 officers and from 26 to 28 non-commissioned officers and sailors. The ship's equipment included a rescue pump with a capacity of 350 t/h, a radio station, and a derrick with rollers for lifting floats and anchors. For transport and rescue purposes, ORP Smok was equipped with a motorboat, which was later replaced with a six-oared onboard boat. For anti-aircraft defense, the ship was armed with two MG 08 machine guns of 7.92 mm caliber mounted on naval bases on the superstructure. Additionally, two 37 mm caliber guns were positioned lower.

== Service in France and Belgium ==
Since 1922, the tugboat sailed under the name Le Boxeur in the French merchant navy, stationed in Bordeaux. In 1926, it was sold to the private company Ateliers & Chantiers Martimes du Sud Ouest from Bordeaux. In 1929, the vessel was purchased by the French company Enterprise Generale de Travaux Martimes, also from Bordeaux. A year later, the vessel was acquired by the Belgian company Remorquage Letzer Ltd. and was renamed Leopold. Its home port became Antwerp. In 1932, the vessel was put up for sale and subsequently purchased by the Polish Navy on 12 October 1932.

== Service in Poland ==
In 1930, with the imminent commissioning of Wicher-class destroyers and Wilk-class submarines, the Command of the Polish Navy decided to purchase a new, powerful sea-going tugboat to ensure the efficient operation of the Oksywie naval port and training grounds, and to serve as a rescue and salvage ship. Between 1931 and 1932, the Command of the Polish Navy received dozens of offers from foreign companies and domestic intermediaries. One of these was from the French company Edmond Salles, offering the sea-going tug Leopold. The same vessel was also offered by the Dutch company Snenson and Jaspersen through the intermediary L. Ruciński from Gdynia. It is unknown which offer was chosen, but the tug was purchased for 175,000 Belgian francs. In the fall of 1932, Command of the Polish Navy representatives, Commander Aleksander Rylke and Commander F. Bomba, went to Antwerp, where they inspected the refurbished tugboat and conducted acceptance trials. After the trials, on November 4, the vessel, commanded by Belgian Captain Tielemans and partially crewed by Polish sailors, sailed to Gdynia. The final acceptance took place on November 8.

Initially, the ship was named Piast, but on 15 November 1932, the Minister of Military Affairs incorporated the tug into the fleet as a ship of the Republic of Poland and named it ORP Smok. The first commander of the vessel was appointed as Captain Mikołaj Szemiot. In the Polish Navy Shipyard, the ship was armed with two heavy machine guns on naval mounts in February 1933. The work was completed on March 8, and ORP Smok began service as a warship. The ship underwent frequent modifications. In 1934, the forward quarters were adapted to accommodate seven cadets of the navigation course of the Naval Officer School, making the ship a training vessel.

In 1931, four FM-class minesweepers were decommissioned. The fleet command decided to create a Mine Division, which would include ORP Smok and the mine barges: KM 111, KM 112, and KM 113. The duties of the division included checking the combat readiness of naval mines, transporting them on barges towed by Smok, training in laying and retrieving them, and training specialists in underwater weapons. In 1935, to fulfill these new duties, the ship underwent partial reconstruction: the old mast with a boom was replaced with a new steel mast with a spotlight and a boom with a lifting capacity of 3 tons. These changes enabled the unit to lift mines during night exercises and to set up and dismantle parts of the torpedo range. After the reconstruction, the ship was classified as an auxiliary mine vessel. In the summer of 1935, cadets of the Mechanical Department of the Naval School completed a two-month sea practice on Smok.

Commanders of the vessel
Captain Mikołaj Szemiot	1 March 1933	June 1934
Lieutenant Viktor Lomidze	June 1934	October 1934
?	October 1934	1 December 1934
Captain Jan Grudziński	1 December 1934	22 January 1935
Captain Jerzy Kossakowski	22 January 1935	14 March 1935
Captain Zbigniew Wojewódzki	14 March 1935	February 1936
?	February 1936	August 1937
Captain Romuald Nałęcz-Tymiński	August 1937	December 1937
?	December 1937	May 1938
Captain Józef Wierzchowski	4 May 1938	8 October 1938
?	October 1938	May 1939
Captain Józef Giertowski	May 1939	24 August 1939
Ensign Stanisław Jaworski	24 August 1939	30 September 1939

Despite being reclassified as an auxiliary mine vessel, ORP Smok continued to primarily tow large artillery targets during gunnery exercises. Until 1937, the six-hundred-meter (2,000 ft) tow cable was handled manually, a strenuous and dangerous task. In that year, a steam towing winch was installed, improving the efficiency of towing operations. Modifications were also made to the stern, where a frame boom and a derrick with rollers were installed for lifting floats and anchors. Due to numerous modifications, the ship had poor stability; in 1938, it underwent a repair to improve this. As a result, the aft mast was removed, the motorboat was replaced with a six-oared onboard boat, and the funnel was reinforced and thickened as it frequently burned through. After these changes, stability tests conducted in the fall of 1938 showed that the ship's displacement with full equipment increased to 711 tons. After the repair, the ship was based at Hel, where it was to service the mine barges. By order of the Minister of Military Affairs, Smok was reclassified as a tug and lost the title ORP.

From the spring of 1939, due to the tense political situation between Poland and Germany, Smok transported workshop equipment from Oksywie to Hel. The British declaration of guarantees for Poland's independence announced by Prime Minister Neville Chamberlain eased the situation, allowing the ship to embark on a training cruise in early July with six sub-lieutenants – students of the Navigational Officers Course. The ship traveled the route: Gdynia, Horten, Liepāja, Ventspils, Tallinn, Narva, Norrköping, Visby, Kalmar, and arrived at the Hel naval port on August 24. This was the last voyage of a Polish ship on the Baltic Sea before the war. After the training cruise, command of the ship was taken over by Ensign Stanisław Jaworski.

== Participation in the September Campaign ==
Before the outbreak of the war, the ship was subordinated to the Commander of the Hel Fortified Area and was also rearmed. Two 37 mm guns were mounted on naval bases on both sides of the superstructure amidships. However, ammunition for these guns had not been delivered by the time the war began.

On 1 September 1939, Smok was in the naval port at Oksywie. Before 7:00 AM, three German seaplanes flew over the port. The crews of the Polish ships fired anti-aircraft guns at them, but the fire was opened when the planes were out of range. Crates containing documents and equipment from the Fleet Command were hastily loaded onto the tugboat with the intention of delivering them to Hel. As the loading was being completed at 2:00 PM, the port was attacked by 32 German Junkers Ju 87 dive bombers from the IV.(St)/LG 1 squadron. Despite the heavy bombing, the vessel did not suffer significant damage and repelled the attacks with machine guns.

From September 2, Smok participated in repelling numerous air attacks on the naval port in Hel. According to Stanisław Piaskowski, the vessel moved to Jastarnia. It made several trips between Hel and Gdynia, including towing mine barges, during which it was fired upon by the battleship Schleswig-Holstein. During one of its trips to Gdynia to collect food from the port warehouses, the tugboat's crew found abandoned anti-aircraft Bofors 40 mm guns in train cars. These were guns purchased by England before the war, but they had not been sent. The guns were transported to Hel, where they strengthened the peninsula's air defense. During the operations, seven crew members were wounded. Before the capitulation of Hel, Smok was scuttled to block the entrance to the port.

== Service in Germany ==
The ship, raised by the Germans, was towed to Gdańsk for repairs. After the repairs were completed, it was commissioned in 1940 under the name Rixhöft and subordinated to the Marinearsenal in Gdynia. It served in a towing and rescue capacity. The name Rixhöft was also given to the former ORP Rybitwa, which had been incorporated into the Kriegsmarine.

On 2 March 1945, near the port of Warnemünde, the vessel was en route to rescue the U-boat U-3519, which was sinking due to an explosion from an aerial naval mine. During this mission, Rixhöft also struck a mine and sank near a navigational buoy at the position 54.11 N/12.05 E. Twenty-one crew members perished, and seven were rescued. In the 1950s, the wreck was located at the position 54.16.10 N/12.07.00 E (approximately 8 km, 5.0 mi north of the sinking site) and subsequently raised and removed by East German authorities.
