= SS Reiher =

At least three steamships have been named Reiher;

- SS Reiher (1870), a German cargo ship in service 1871–1907.
- SS Reiher (1909), a German cargo ship in service 1909–1938.
- SS Reiher (1938), a German cargo ship in service 1938–1939.
