= Richard McBride =

Canadian politician (1870–1917)

Sir Richard McBride KCMG KC
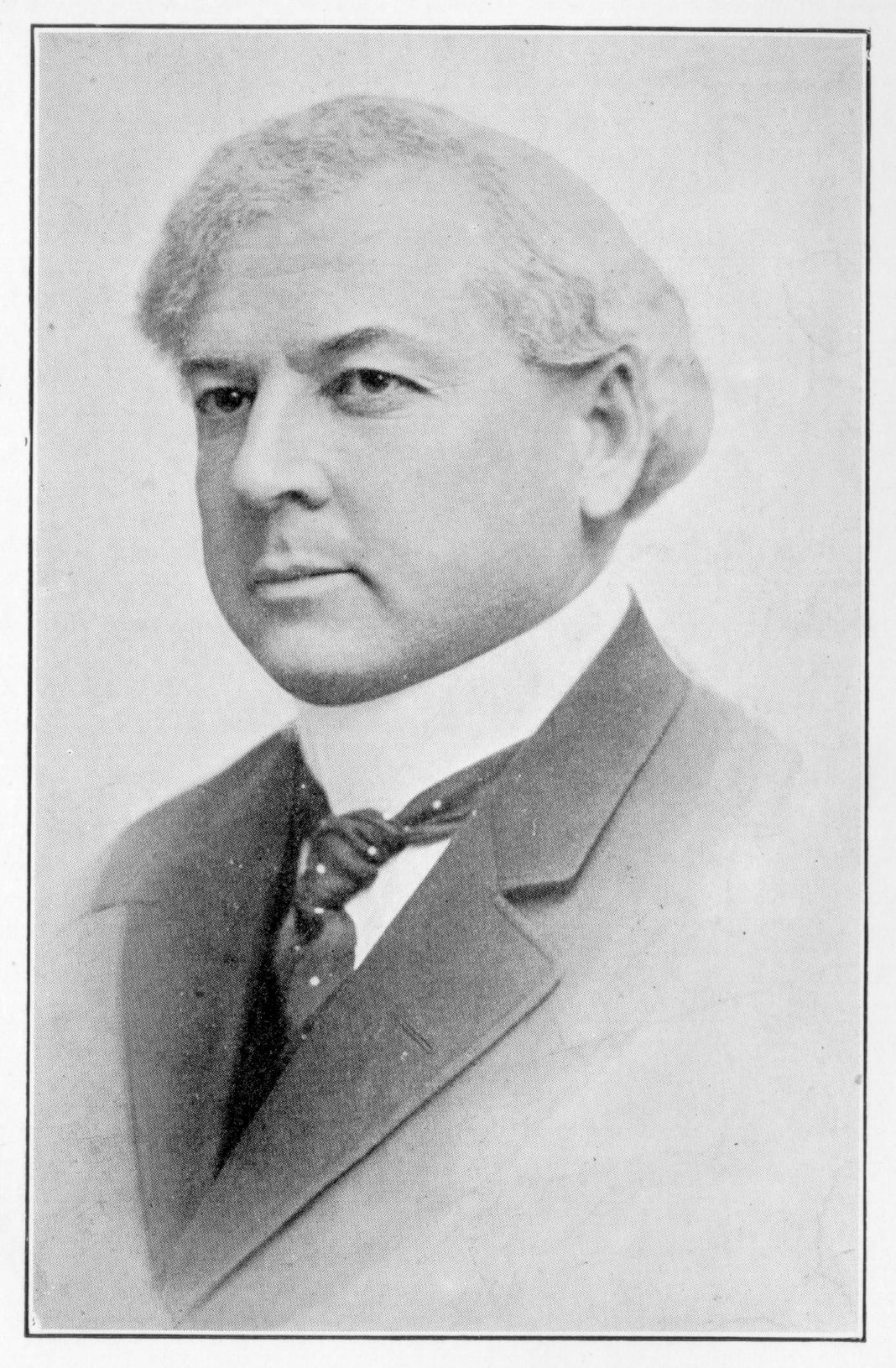
- McBride in 1912

16th Premier of British Columbia
- In office June 1, 1903 – December 15, 1915
- Monarchs: Edward VII; George V
- Lieutenant Governor: Henri-Gustave Joly de Lotbinière; James Dunsmuir; Thomas Wilson Paterson; Francis Stillman Barnard
- Preceded by: Edward Gawler Prior
- Succeeded by: William John Bowser

Member of the British Columbia Legislative Assembly
- In office February 2, 1907 – December 15, 1915 Serving with Henry Frederick William Behnsen, Frederick Davey, Henry Broughton Thomson
- Preceded by: William George Cameron; Richard Low Drury; Richard Hall; James Dugald McNiven
- Succeeded by: Harlan Carey Brewster
- Constituency: Victoria City
- In office July 9, 1898 – March 28, 1912
- Preceded by: Colin Buchanan Sword
- Succeeded by: Alexander Lucas
- Constituency: Westminster-Dewdney (1898–1903); Dewdney (1903–1909); Yale (1909–1912)

Personal details
- Born: December 15, 1870 New Westminster, Colony of British Columbia, British Empire
- Died: August 6, 1917 (aged 46) London, England
- Party: Conservative
- Other political affiliations: Government
- Spouse: Christine Margaret McGillivray (m. 1896)
- Children: 6 daughters
- Education: Schulich School of Law
- Occupation: lawyer
- Profession: politician
- Cabinet: Minister of Mines (1900–1901)

Sir Richard McBride, KCMG KC (December 15, 1870 – August 6, 1917) was a British Columbia politician and is often considered the founder of the British Columbia Conservative Party. McBride was first elected to the provincial legislature in the 1898 election and served in the cabinet of James Dunsmuir from 1900 to 1901 as Minister of Mines. McBride believed that the province's system of non-party government was unstable and hindered development. The lieutenant-governor appointed him the 16th premier in June 1903 and McBride announced that his government was a Conservative Party administration and would contest the upcoming election along party lines. On October 3, 1903, McBride's party, the British Columbia Conservative Party won the first provincial election to be fought along party lines with a two-seat majority.

Richard McBride is interred in the Ross Bay Cemetery in Victoria, British Columbia.

== Premier of British Columbia ==
The new Conservative government attempted to stabilize the economy by cutting spending and raising new taxes. It also introduced progressive reforms of the province's labour law. In 1909 McBride unveiled plans for a provincial university and promised to build more railway lines. The party won commanding majorities in the 1909 and 1912 elections, almost shutting the Opposition out of the legislature.

McBride's Conservatives were aligned with the federal Conservatives of Robert Borden and helped them take power in the 1911 federal election. On the first day of the First World War, the provincial government purchased and took possession of two submarines (HMCS CC-1 and HMCS CC-2) to defend the province from the threat of German attack. As provinces are not constitutionally allowed to maintain militaries, they were quickly transferred by order to the federal government within 48 hours and entered service with the Royal Canadian Navy in August 1914.

His government was also responsible for the creation of the province's first university, the University of British Columbia, which opened its doors in 1915.

The government's popularity waned as an economic downturn hit the province along with the mounting railway debts. McBride resigned on December 15, 1915, to become the province's representative in London, where he died in 1917.

During his time as Premier, he also served as Minister of Education (1903 to 1904), Minister of Lands and Works (1903), Minister of Mines (1903 to 1915), President of the Council (1913 to 1915), and Provincial Secretary (1903 to 1904).

== Legacy ==
The small community of McBride, British Columbia, was named after this premier during the time he was in office. Also named for the premier, the McBride River in northern British Columbia is a major tributary of the Stikine.

Richard McBride Elementary School (now renamed to Skwo:wech Elementary School) in New Westminster was built in 1912 and replaced the Sapperton School nearby, after burning down it was rebuilt as the current school being completed in 1929. Sir Richard McBride Elementary School in Vancouver was named after him in 1911 during his tenure as Premier as well as McBride Park in Kitsilano on July 26, 1911. (During World War I the park was used for the cultivation of vegetables.) Mount McBride, a peak in Strathcona Park on Vancouver Island, is also named after the premier.

Also named for him is McBride Boulevard in New Westminster which is the western ramp for the Pattullo Bridge.

== See also ==
HMCS CC-1 and HMCS CC-2
