= SS Nautilus =

Ship

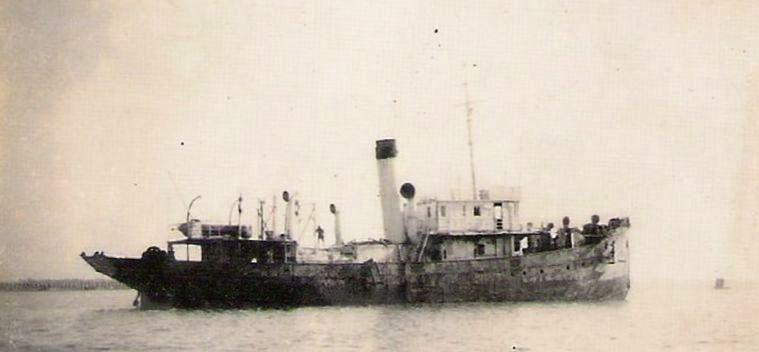
- SS Nautilus sailing in India

History
- Name: Activo (1913–); Nautilus
- Launched: 1913
- Fate: Scrapped 1948

General characteristics
- Tonnage: 300 tons

SS Nautilus, a 300-ton vessel, was built in 1913 in Hamburg, Germany and originally named Activo.

Activo fell into British hands, probably as a captured German ship, who re-registered her under the name SS Nautilus, and they in turn sold her to the Ceylon (now Sri Lanka) government, which was then part of the British Empire, for deep sea fishing.

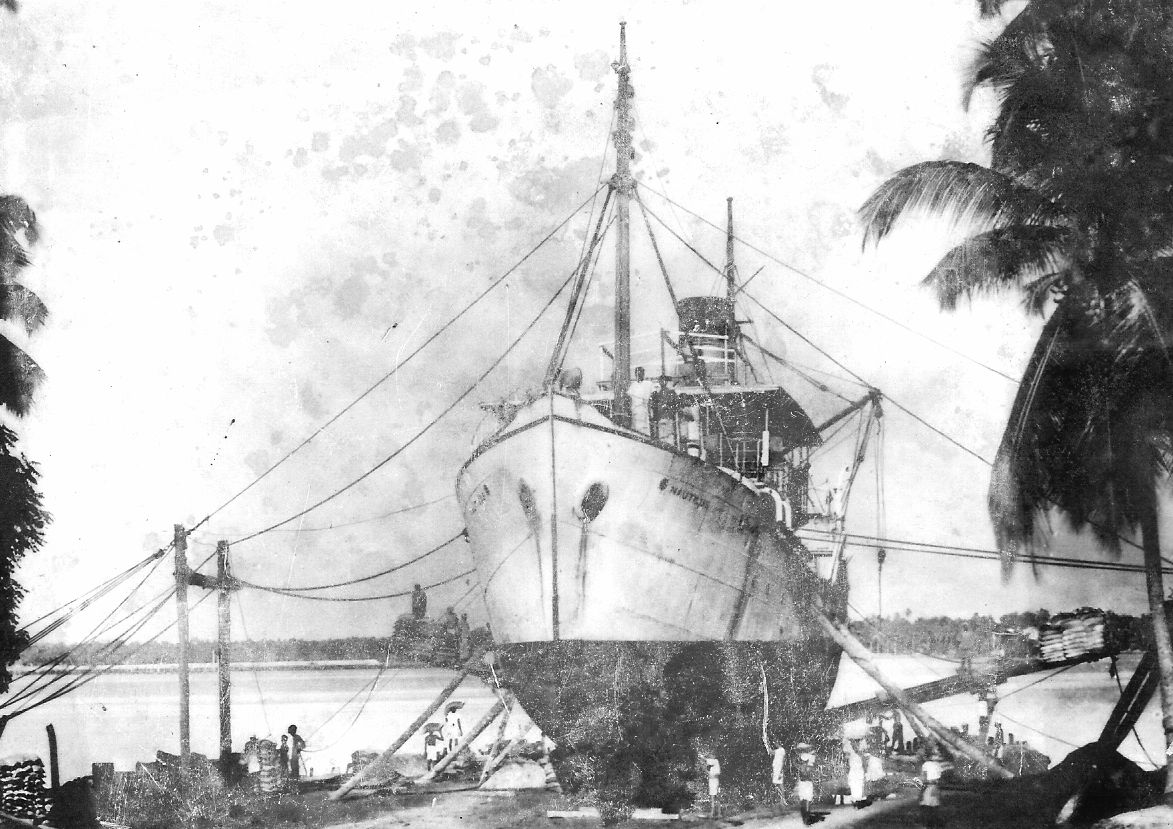
SS Nautilus on land for repairs

The Ceylon government could not use the ship effectively in deep sea fishing and auctioned the ship off in 1939 to C.S Krishnaswamy Naidu an industrialist from India. The ship was purchased to support deep sea fishing for Malabar Fisheries, a sardine canning company in Chaliyam, Calicut. However, the ship needed repairs before it could be put to use and was brought to Palluruthy (Kerala, India) and docked on the land for repairs.

Due to the start of World War II, the British naval authorities in Cochin demanded that the ship be handed over to them for defence purposes. A new steam boiler was installed and guns mounted on the deck. She was then used on patrol in the Arabian Sea guarding the west coast of India. This continued till the end of war in 1945.

After the war, the ship was only returned to her owner after numerous delays. By that time she required extensive repairs and was instead sold as scrap in 1948.
