= HMS H11 =

Submarine of the Royal Navy

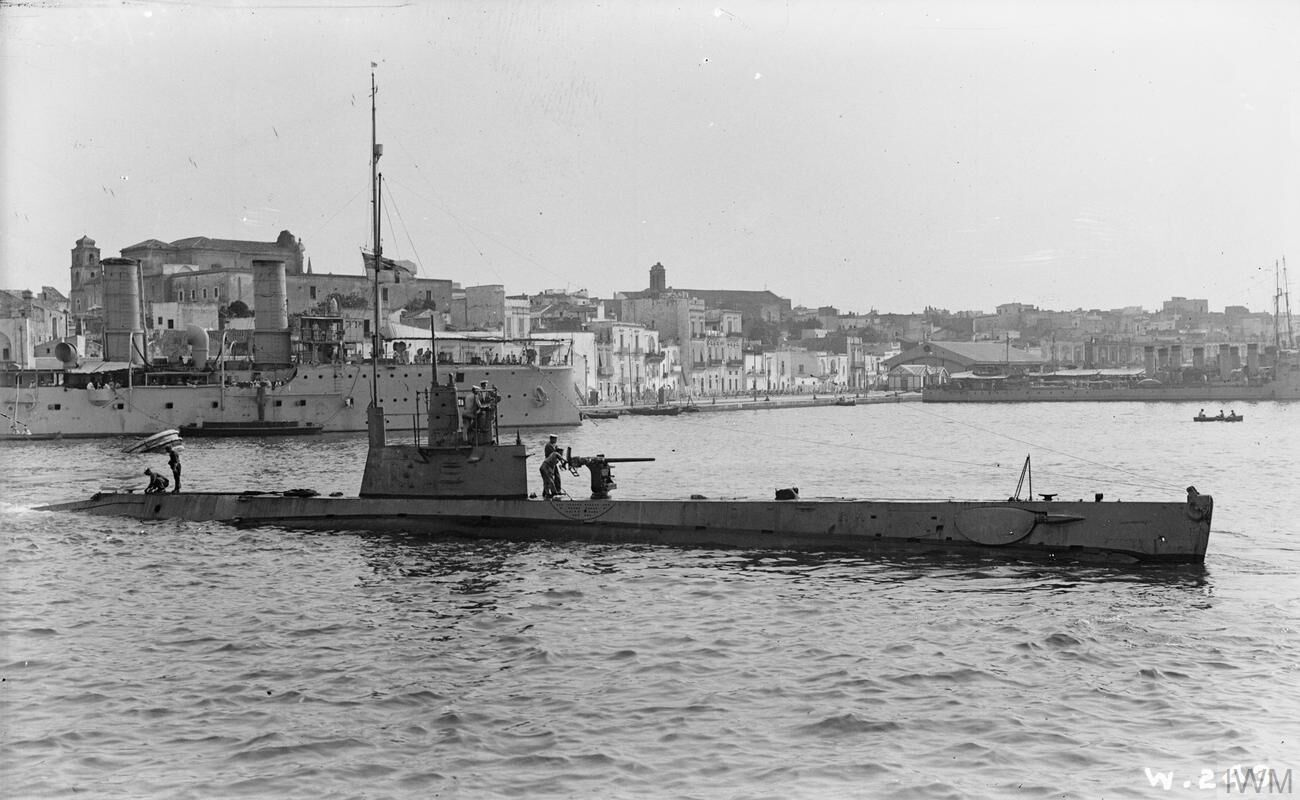
- HMS H4, another submarine of the same class

History

United Kingdom
- Name: HMS H11
- Builder: Fore River Yard
- Commissioned: 1915
- Fate: Sold, 20 October 1920

General characteristics
- Class & type: H-class submarine

HMS H11 was a British H-class submarine built by Fore River Yard, Quincy, Massachusetts. She was laid down on an unknown date and was commissioned in 1915. H11 along with HMS H12 to HMS H20 were all built in the United States but were interned by the United States government until that nation entered World War I. H11 was sold on 20 October 1920 in Dover and lost on tow to the breaker's yard. The wreck was identified 2007.

== Design ==
She had a displacement of 364 long tons (370 t) at the surface and 434 long tons (441 t) while submerged. Her total length was 150 feet 3 inches (45.8 m), with a beam of 15 feet 4 inches (4.7 m) and a draught of 12 feet (3.7 m).

Her two diesel engines provided a total power of 480 horsepower (360 kW) and her two electric motors provided 320 horsepower (240 kW) power which gave the submarine a maximum surface speed of 13 knots (24 km/h; 15 mph) and a submerged speed of 11 knots (20 km/h; 13 mph). She would normally carry 16.4 long tons (16.7 t) of fuel and had a maximum capacity of 18 long tons (18 t) and a range of 1,600 nautical miles (2,963 km; 1,841 mi). The boat was armed with a 6-pounder (2.7 kg) Hotchkiss quick-firing gun and four 18-inch (457 mm) bow torpedo tubes with six 18-inch (457 mm) torpedoes carried. The complement was twenty-two crew members.

== Bibliography ==
- Gardiner, Robert (1985). Conway's All the World's Fighting Ships 1906–1921. Conway Maritime Press. ISBN 0-85177-245-5.
- Hutchinson, Robert (2001). Jane's submarines : war beneath the waves from 1776 to the present day. London: HarperCollins. ISBN 9780007105588.
