= HMCS CH-15 =

British and Canadian submarine

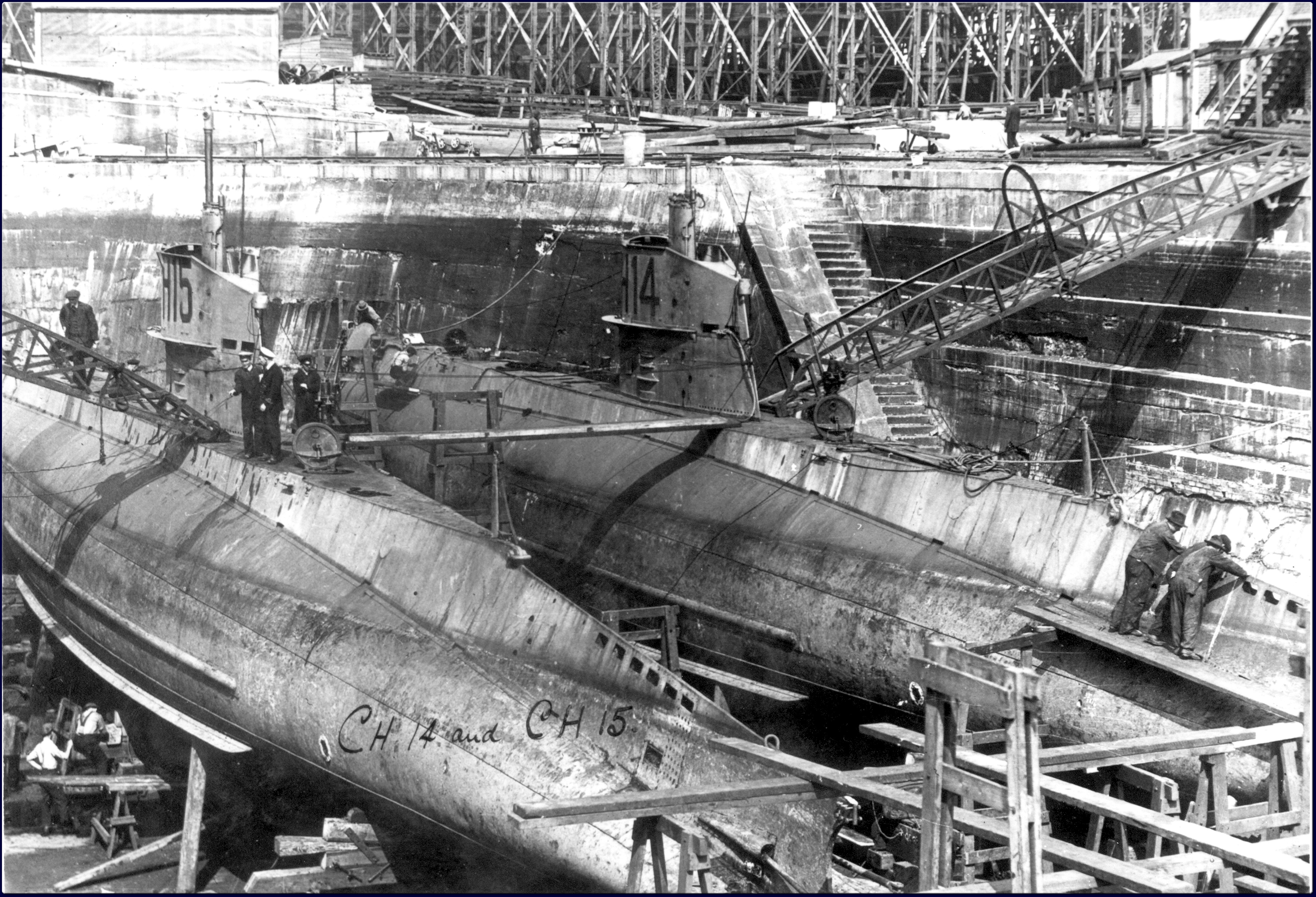
- CH-14 (right) and CH-15 (left) in drydock.

History

United Kingdom
- Name: H15
- Ordered: November 1915
- Builder: Fore River Co. Quincy
- Out of service: 7 February 1919

Canada
- Name: CH-15
- Acquired: 7 February 1919
- Commissioned: 1 April 1921
- Decommissioned: 30 June 1922
- Fate: Discarded 1926, scrapped 1927

General characteristics
- Class & type: H-class submarine
- Displacement: 364 long tons (370 t) (surfaced); 434 long tons (441 t) (submerged)
- Length: 45.8 m (150 ft 3 in) o/a
- Beam: 4.6 m (15 ft 1 in)
- Draught: 3.68 m (12 ft 1 in)
- Propulsion: Twin-shift, 480 hp (360 kW) Vickers diesel, 2 × 620 hp (460 kW) electric motors
- Speed: 13 knots (24 km/h; 15 mph) (surfaced); 10 knots (19 km/h; 12 mph) (submerged)
- Range: 1,600 nmi (3,000 km; 1,800 mi) at 10 knots surfaced
- Test depth: 200 m (660 ft)
- Complement: 22
- Armament: 4 × 18 in (450 mm) bow tubes; 6 torpedoes

HMCS CH-15 was a H-class submarine originally ordered for the Royal Navy as H15 during the First World War. Constructed in the United States during their neutrality, the submarine was withheld from the Royal Navy until after the US entry into the war. Entering service at the very end of the war, the submarine saw no action and was laid up at Bermuda following the cessation of hostilities. The British government gave the submarine to Canada in 1919, and it was in service with the Royal Canadian Navy from 1921 to 1922 as CH-15. The submarine was sold for scrap and broken up in 1927.

== Design and description ==
Ordered as part of the War Emergency Programme for the Royal Navy from Bethlehem Steel of the United States, the H class were constructed at two shipyards, Canadian Vickers in Montreal, Quebec, Canada, and the Fore River Yard in Quincy, Massachusetts, United States, based on the US H-class design. The boats displaced 364 long tons (370 t) while surfaced and 434 long tons (441 t) submerged. They were 45.8 metres (150 ft 3 in) long overall with a beam of 4.6 metres (15 ft 1 in) and a draught of 3.68 metres (12 ft 1 in). They had a complement of 4 officers and 18 ratings.

The submarines were powered by a twin-shift, 480 horsepower (360 kW) Vickers diesel and two 620 hp (460 kW) electric motors. This gave the boats a maximum surfaced speed of 13 knots (24 km/h; 15 mph) and a submerged speed of 10 knots (19 km/h; 12 mph). They had a fuel capacity of 16 long tons (16 t) of diesel fuel. This gave them a range of 1,600 nautical miles (3,000 km; 1,800 mi) at 10 knots while surfaced. They had a designed diving depth of 200 metres (660 ft). The submarines were armed with four 18-inch (450 mm) torpedo tubes in the bow for the six torpedoes they carried.

== Service history ==
=== Royal Navy ===
In November 1914 the Royal Navy contracted Bethlehem Steel to construct a batch of H-class submarines at their Fore River Shipyard in Quincy, Massachusetts. These ships were to be armed only in Montreal. This second batch was seized by the American government due to their neutrality at the time and were only released after the United States had entered the war in 1917. H15 was one such boat and while under construction, the submarine was accidentally sunk at her berth in 30 feet (9.1 m) of water while fitting out in December 1917. This delayed her completion for six months, H15 finally being declared completed on 14 August 1918.

On 9 November 1918 H15 left New York City and sailed for Bermuda. However, while en route, the First World War ended and upon arriving at Bermuda, H15 remained there in reserve. In mid-December 1918 her crew left in ships for return to the United Kingdom.

=== Royal Canadian Navy ===
On 7 February 1919, the Royal Navy formally transferred H15 and her sister H14 to the Royal Canadian Navy. The two boats, both in Bermuda still, had lain unused since December. However, even though United Kingdom government had taken the decision to give the two submarines to Canada, they left it to Canada to find crews to move the boats from Bermuda. The Royal Canadian Navy did not want them and tried to get the Admiralty to take them back.

The Royal Canadian Navy, forced to take the submarines, was in turn obligated to discontinue the use of the CC-class submarines as they could not equip all four boats. H15 arrived at Halifax, Nova Scotia, in June 1919. Like the previous CC class, a "C" was placed in front of the name of the ship to denote it belonged to Canada.

Commissioned into the Royal Canadian Navy on 1 April 1921 at Halifax it took two months to make CH-15 and her sister operational. By July 1921 both boats were functioning and exercised with the rest of the Canadian armed forces practising harbour defence. While in service the submarine was used primarily for training anti-submarine warfare. After arguing that remaining at Halifax during the winter months would be detrimental to the vessels' status, CH-15 and her sister, accompanied by HMS Wistaria, wintered at Bermuda. The two submarines returned to Halifax in April 1922. Following the election of Mackenzie King government, the Naval Service was required to cut expenditures. Upon their return it was found that the government had refused to pay for the upkeep of the submarines and they were paid off on 22 June 1922.

Following their decommissioning, a report was commissioned that examined the cost of maintaining and re-activating the submarines. It was found too costly and the plan was abandoned. In February 1925 the Admiralty enquired into the condition of the two warships and the response was negative, questioning the two boats ability to return to service. In 1926 the two submarines were put for sale along with HMCS Aurora, the proceeds of the sale going to the Royal Navy. CH-15 was sold on 9 March 1927 for scrap and broken up.
