= List of ships and submarines built in Barrow-in-Furness =

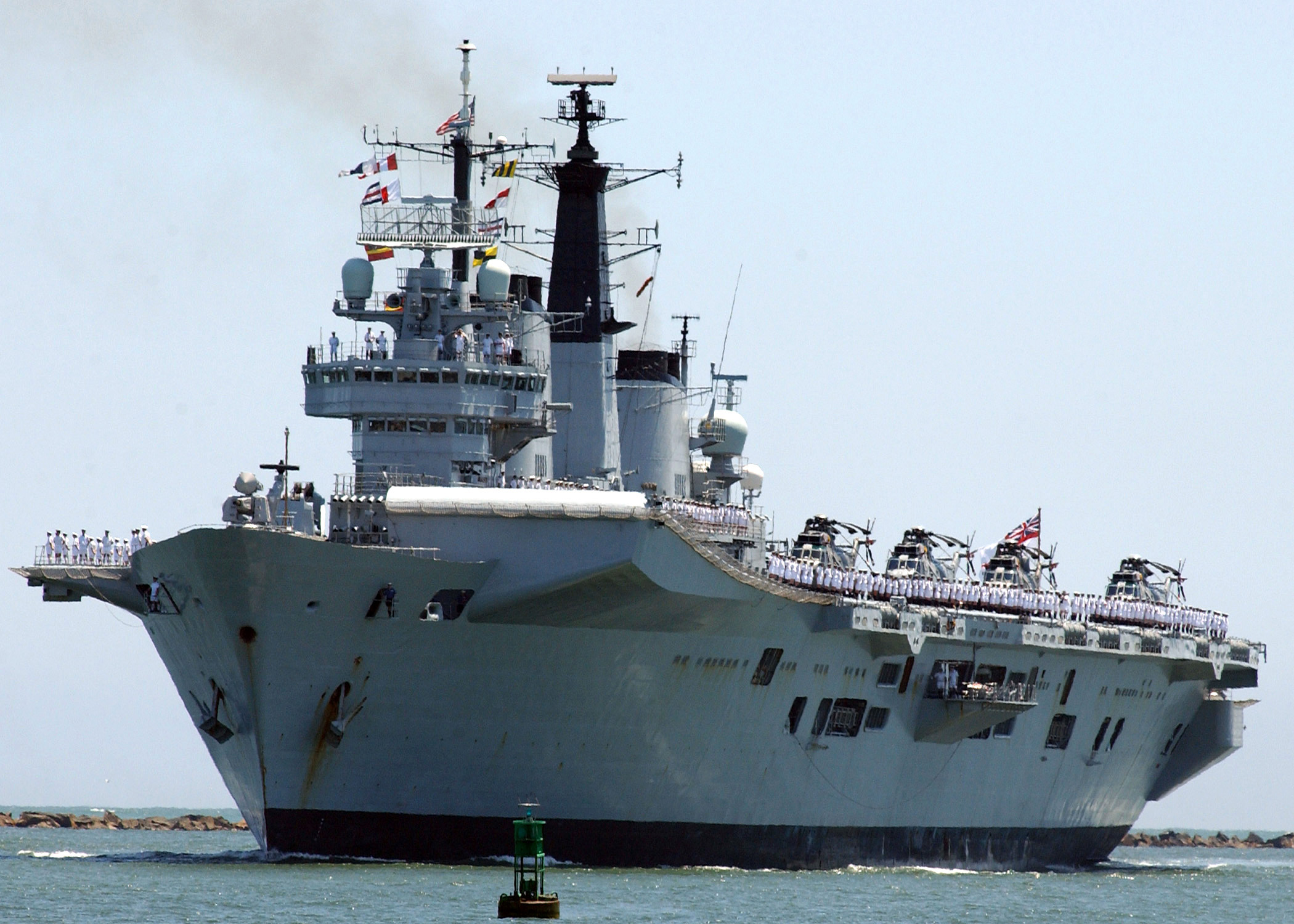
HMS Invincible was often referred to as the 'Pride of Barrow'

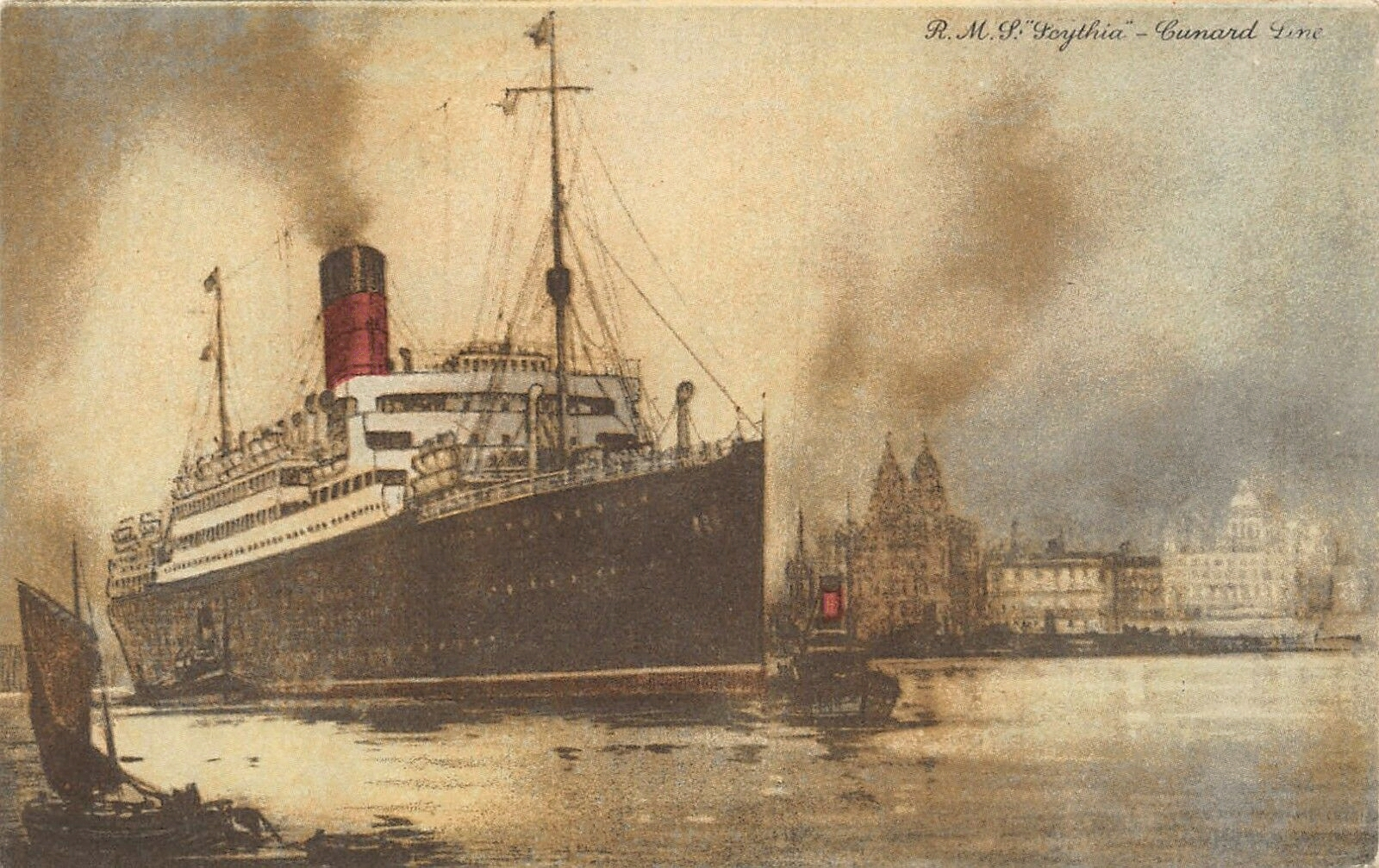
RMS Scythia was one of Cunard's longest serving liners

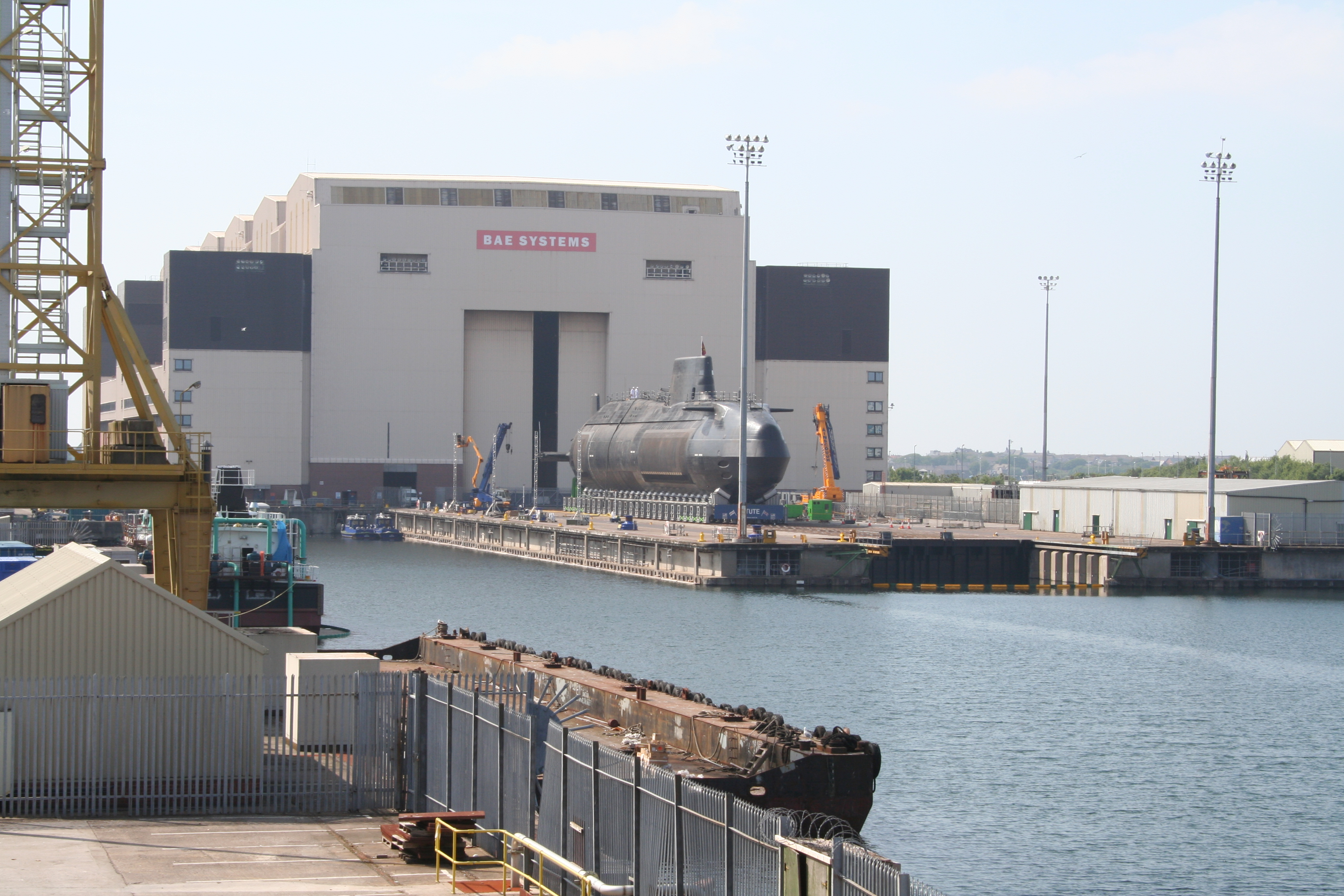
HMS Astute outside DDH in 2007

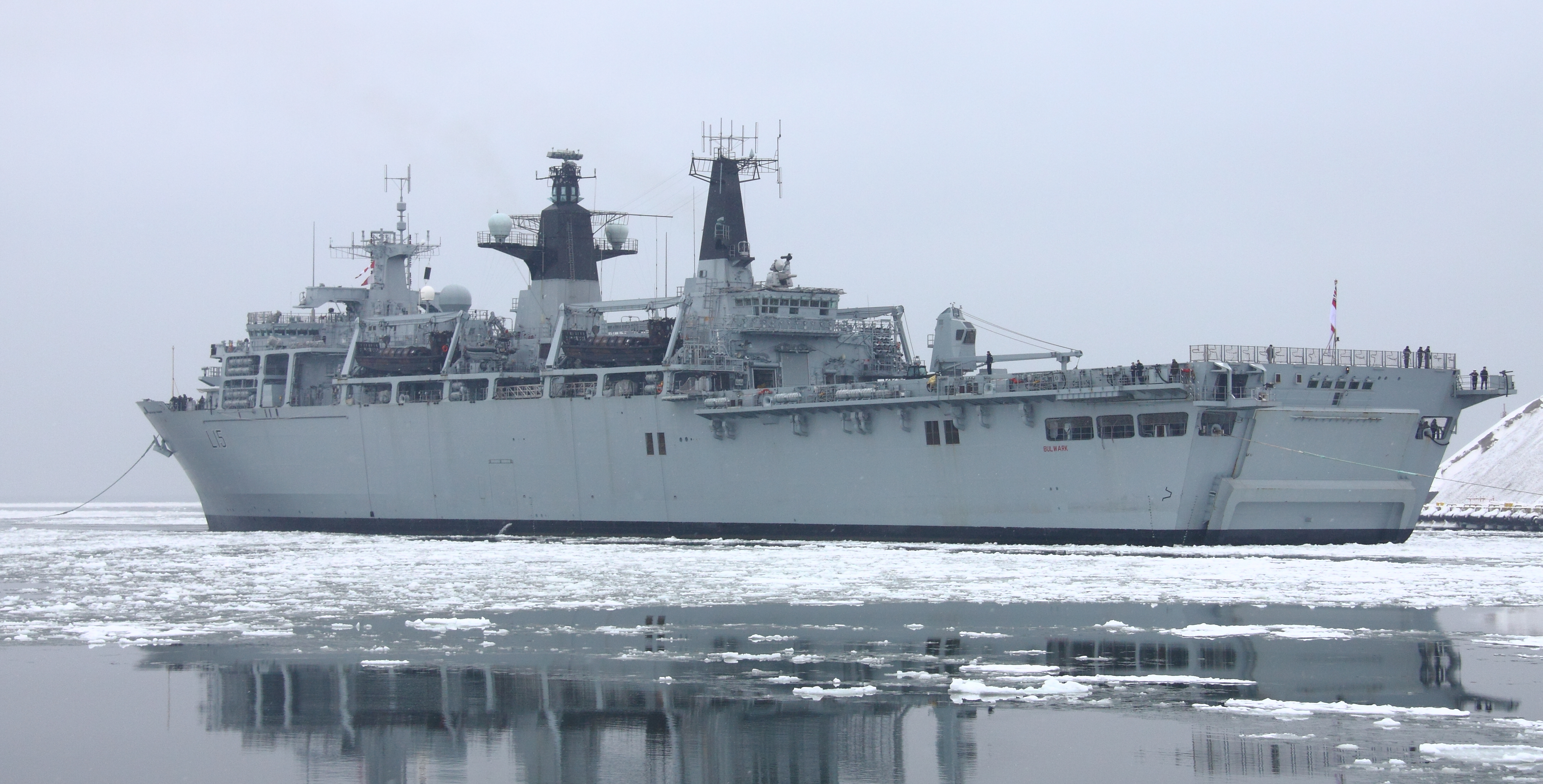
HMS Bulwark the former Royal Navy flagship and the most recent surface vessel built in Barrow

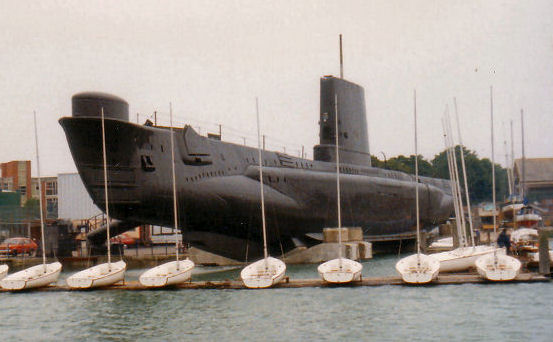
HMS Alliance preserved at the Royal Navy Submarine Museum in Gosport

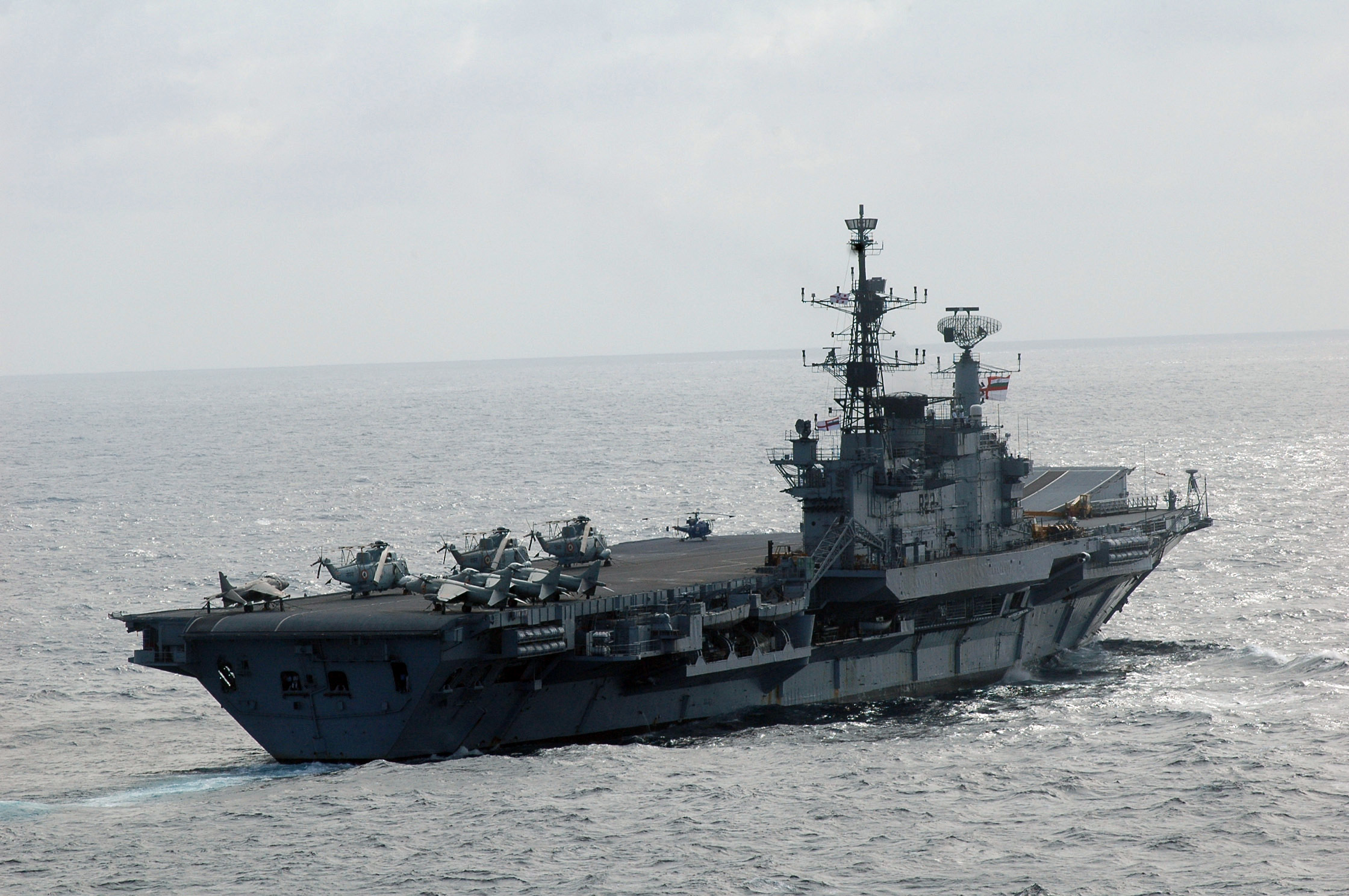
INS Viraat of the Indian Navy is the longest serving vessel built in Barrow

Below is a detailed list of the ships and submarines built in Barrow-in-Furness, England by the Barrow Shipbuilding Company, Vickers-Armstrongs, Vickers Shipbuilding and Engineering, BAE Systems Marine, BAE Systems Submarine Solutions or any other descendant companies. Whilst it is extensive it is incomplete as there are some smaller commercial vessels missing from the list.

As of 2006, 373 merchant ships, 312 submarines and 148 naval surface ships have been built in Barrow (for navies and companies based in the likes of Argentina, Australia, Brazil, Canada, France, India, Japan, Netherlands, Russia, United Kingdom, United States).

All but three nuclear submarines of the Royal Navy were built in Barrow, including the latest class of fleet submarines currently under construction by BAE Systems Submarine Solutions, utilising the massive Devonshire Dock Hall.

Some of the most notable vessels to be built in Barrow include the former Royal Navy flagships HMS Albion, HMS Bulwark, HMS Invincible, and HMS Ocean. Abdül Hamid (the first submarine in the world to fire a live torpedo underwater), HMS Upholder (the most successful Royal Navy submarine of World War II) and the 103,000-ton oil tanker British Admiral (once the world's largest ship) were also built in Barrow, as were a number of ocean liners for Cunard, Inman Line, Orient Line and P&O.

== Active vessels ==
As of 2024, the following naval ships and submarines built in Barrow are known to be active in service around the world.

- Alborz – Frigate of the Islamic Republic of Iran Navy (Commissioned in 1971)
- HMS Albion – Amphibious transport dock of the Royal Navy (Commissioned in 2003)
- HMS Ambush – Submarine of the Royal Navy (Commissioned in 2013)
- HMS Anson – Submarine of the Royal Navy (Commissioned in 2022)
- HMS Artful – Submarine of the Royal Navy (Commissioned in 2016)
- HMS Astute – Submarine of the Royal Navy (Commissioned in 2010)
- HMS Audacious – Submarine of the Royal Navy (Commissioned in 2020)
- Atlântico – Amphibious assault ship of the Brazilian Navy (commissioned in 1998 as HMS Ocean of the Royal Navy)
- HMS Bulwark – Amphibious transport dock of the Royal Navy (Commissioned in 2004)
- HMCS Chicoutimi – Submarine of the Royal Canadian Navy (Commissioned in 1990 as HMS Upholder of the Royal Navy)
- Sabalan – Frigate of the Islamic Republic of Iran Navy (Commissioned in 1971)
- HMS Vanguard – Submarine of the Royal Navy (Commissioned in 1993)
- HMS Vengeance – Submarine of the Royal Navy (Commissioned in 1999)
- HMS Victorious – Submarine of the Royal Navy (Commissioned in 1995)
- HMS Vigilant – Submarine of the Royal Navy (Commissioned in 1996)
- RFA Wave Knight – Fleet tanker of the Royal Fleet Auxiliary (Commissioned in 2003)

== Inactive preserved vessels ==
- HMS Alliance – Preserved at the Royal Navy Submarine Museum in Gosport, United Kingdom
- HMS Churchill – Laid up in Rosyth Dockyard, United Kingdom
- HMS Dreadnought – Laid up in Rosyth Dockyard, United Kingdom
- INS Gal – Preserved at the Clandestine Immigration and Naval Museum in Haifa, Israel
- HMS Holland 1 – Preserved at the Royal Navy Submarine Museum in Gosport, United Kingdom
- Japanese battleship Mikasa – Museum ship in Yokosuka, Japan
- EML Lembit – Preserved at the Estonian Maritime Museum in Tallinn, Estonia
- HMS Resolution – Laid up in Rosyth Dockyard, United Kingdom
- HMS Repulse – Laid up in Rosyth Dockyard, United Kingdom
- Brazilian submarine Riachuelo – Preserved at the Navy Cultural Centre in Rio de Janeiro, Brazil
- HMS Swiftsure – Laid up in Rosyth Dockyard, United Kingdom

== All vessels ==
=== Military ships ===
Name	Class	Built For	Laid down	Launched	Fate	Image
Almirante Riveros	Almirante-class destroyer	Chilean Navy	1956	1958	1998 (Decommissioned)	
Almirante Saldanha	Training ship	Brazilian Navy	1933	1933		
Almirante Williams	Almirante-class destroyer	Chilean Navy	1956	1958	1998 (Decommissioned)	
ARA Buenos Aires (D-6)	Buenos Aires-class destroyer	(Argentina) Argentine Navy	1937	1937	1971 (Decommissioned)	
ARA Corrientes	Buenos Aires-class destroyer	(Argentina) Argentine Navy	1937	1937	1941 (Destroyed)	
ARA Entre Rios	Buenos Aires-class destroyer	(Argentina) Argentine Navy	1936	1937	1973 (Decommissioned)	
ARA Hércules	Type 42 destroyer	(Argentina) Argentine Navy	1971	1976	In active service	
ARA La Argentina	Light cruiser	(Argentina) Argentine Navy	1936	1937	1974 (Decommissioned)	
São Paulo	Minas Geraes-class battleship	Brazilian Navy	1907	1909	1951 (Destroyed)	
Ying Swei	Chao Ho-class cruiser	Republic of China Navy	1910	1911	1937 (Destroyed)	
Araucano	Submarine tender	Chilean Navy		1929	1959 (Decommissioned)	
ARV Aragua	Nueva Esparta-class destroyer	Bolivarian Navy of Venezuela	1953	1955	1975 (Decommissioned)	
ARV Nueva Esparta	Nueva Esparta-class destroyer	Bolivarian Navy of Venezuela	1951	1952	1978 (Decommissioned)	
ARV Zulia	Nueva Esparta-class destroyer	Bolivarian Navy of Venezuela	1951	1953	1983 (Decommissioned)	
TCG Gayret / HMS Ithuriel	I-class destroyer	Turkish Navy / Royal Navy	1939	1940	1942 (Destroyed)	
HMCS Canada	Patrol ship	Royal Canadian Navy		1904	1926 (Destroyed)	
HMS Adventure	Minelaying cruiser	Royal Navy	1922	1924	1947 (Decommissioned)	
HMS Ajax	Leander-class light cruiser	Royal Navy	1933	1934	1948 (Decommissioned)	
HMS Albion	Albion-class landing platform dock	Royal Navy	1998	2001	2025 (Decommissioned)	
HMS Arrow	A-class destroyer	Royal Navy	1928	1929	1943 (Destroyed)	
HMS Bulwark	Albion-class landing platform dock	Royal Navy	2000	2001	2025 (Decommissioned)	
HMS Calcutta	C-class light cruiser	Royal Navy	1917	1918	1941 (Destroyed)	
HMS Cardiff	Type 42 destroyer	Royal Navy	1972	1974	2008 (Decommissioned)	
HMS Cassandra	C-class light cruiser	Royal Navy	1916	1916	1918 (Destroyed)	
HMS Colossus / Arromanches	Colossus-class aircraft carrier	Royal Navy /French Navy		1943	1978 (Decommissioned)	
HMS Crescent / HMCS Fraser	C-class destroyer	Royal Navy / Royal Canadian Navy	1930	1931	1940 (Destroyed)	
HMS Cumberland	County-class cruiser	Royal Navy	1924	1926	1959 (Decommissioned)	
HMS Curlew	C-class light cruiser	Royal Navy	1916	1917	1940 (Destroyed)	
HMS Cygnet / HMCS St. Laurent	C-class destroyer	Royal Navy / Royal Canadian Navy	1930	1931	1947 (Decommissioned)	
HMS Defender	D-class destroyer	Royal Navy	1931	1932	1941 (Destroyed)	
HMS Diamond	D-class destroyer	Royal Navy	1931	1932	1941 (Destroyed)	
HMS Doris	Eclipse-class cruiser	Royal Navy	1894	1896	1919 (Decommissioned)	
HMS Eastbourne	Whitby-class frigate	Royal Navy	1954	1955	1985 (Decommissioned)	
HMS Emperor of India	Iron Duke-class battleship	Royal Navy	1912	1913	1932 (Decommissioned)	
HMS Erne	Black Swan-class sloop	Royal Navy	1938	1939	1965 (Decommissioned)	
HMS Fame / Generalisimo / Sanchez	F-class destroyer	Royal Navy / Dominican Navy	1933	1934	1968 (Decommissioned)	
HMS Greyhound	G-class destroyer	Royal Navy	1934	1935	1941 (Destroyed)	
HMS Griffin / HMCS Ottawa	G-class destroyer	Royal Navy / Royal Canadian Navy	1934	1935	1946 (Decommissioned)	
HMS Hermes / INS Viraat	Centaur-class aircraft carrier	Royal Navy / Indian Navy	1944	1953	2017 (Decommissioned)	
HMS Illustrious	Illustrious-class aircraft carrier	Royal Navy	1937	1939	1956 (Decommissioned)	
HMS Indomitable	Illustrious-class aircraft carrier	Royal Navy	1937	1940	1955 (Decommissioned)	
HMS Invincible	Invincible-class aircraft carrier}	Royal Navy	1973	1977	2011 (Decommissioned)	
HMS Jamaica	Crown Colony-class cruiser	Royal Navy	1939	1940	1960 (Decommissioned)	
HMS Jervis Bay	Ocean liner turned Armed merchant cruiser	(United Kingdom) Aberdeen and Commonwealth Line / Royal Navy		1922	1940 (Destroyed)	
HMS Juno	Eclipse-class cruiser	Royal Navy	1894	1895	1920 (Decommissioned)	
HMS Keith	B-class destroyer	Royal Navy	1929	1930	1940 (Destroyed)	
HMS King Alfred	Drake-class cruiser	Royal Navy		1901	1920 (Decommissioned)	
HMS Liverpool	Bristol-class light cruiser	Royal Navy	1909	1909	1921 (Decommissioned)	
HMS Majestic / HMAS Melbourne	Majestic-class aircraft carrier	Royal Navy / Royal Australian Navy	1943	1945	1985 (Decommissioned)	
HMS Manchester	Type 42 destroyer	Royal Navy	1978	1980	2011 (Decommissioned)	
HMS Medway	Submarine depot ship	Royal Navy		1928	1942 (Destroyed)	
HMS Mohawk	Tribal-class frigate	Royal Navy	1960	1962	1980 (Decommissioned)	
HMS Niobe / HMCS Niobe	Diadem-class cruiser	Royal Navy / Royal Canadian Navy		1897	1922 (Decommissioned)	
HMS Ocean / Atlântico	Helicopter Landing Platform/ Amphibious assault ship	Royal Navy / Brazilian Navy	1994	1995	In active service	
HMS Pioneer	Colossus-class aircraft carrier	Royal Navy	1942	1944	1954 (Decommissioned)	
HMS Powerful	Powerful-class cruiser	Royal Navy	1894	1895	1929 (Decommissioned)	
HMS Princess Royal	Battlecruiser	Royal Navy	1910	1911	1922 (Decommissioned)	
HMS Resource	Fleet Repair ship	Royal Navy		1928		!
HMS Revenge	Revenge-class battleship	Royal Navy	1913	1915	1948 (Decommissioned)	
HMS Scarborough	Whitby-class frigate	Royal Navy	1953	1955	1977 (Decommissioned)	
HMS Sheffield	Type 42 destroyer	Royal Navy	1970	1971	1982 (Destroyed)	
HMS Spartan	Bellona-class cruiser	Royal Navy	1939	1942	1944 (Destroyed)	
HMS Urchin	U-class destroyer	Royal Navy	1942	1943		
HMS Urania	U-class destroyer	Royal Navy	1942	1943		
HMS Vanguard	St. Vincent-class battleship	Royal Navy	1908	1909	1917 (Destroyed)	
HMS Vixen / HMCS Sioux	V-class destroyer	Royal Navy / Royal Canadian Navy	1942	1943	1963 (Decommissioned)	
HMS Wizard	W-class destroyer	Royal Navy	1942	1943	1967 (Decommissioned)	
HMS Wrangler / SAS Vyrstaat	W-class destroyer	Royal Navy / South African Navy	1942	1943	1976 (Decommissioned)	
Iranian frigate Alborz	Alvand-class frigate	Islamic Republic of Iran Navy	1968	1969	In active service	
Iranian frigate Sabalan	Alvand-class frigate	Islamic Republic of Iran Navy		1969	In active service	
Katori	Pre-dreadnought battleship	Imperial Japanese Navy	1904	1905	1924 (Decommissioned)	
Kongō	Kongō-class battlecruiser	Imperial Japanese Navy	1911	1912	1944 (Destroyed)	
Mikasa	Pre-dreadnought battleship	Imperial Japanese Navy	1898	1900	1923 (Decommissioned and preserved)	
Japura /HMS Hurricane	H-class destroyer	Brazilian Navy Brazilian Navy / Royal Navy	1938	1939	1943 (Destroyed)	
Jurua / HMS Harvester / Handy	H-class destroyer	Brazilian Navy / Royal Navy	1938	1939	1943 (Destroyed)	
Libertad / HMS Triumph	Swiftsure-class battleship	Chilean Navy / Royal Navy		1903	1915 (Destroyed)	
Maipo	Oil tanker	Chilean Navy	1929	1930	1964 (Decommissioned)	
Rancagua	Oil tanker	Chilean Navy	1929	1930	1964 (Decommissioned)	
Reşadiye / HMS Erin	Battleship	Ottoman Empire / Royal Navy	1911	1913	1923 (Decommissioned)	
RFA Wave Knight	Wave-class tanker	Royal Navy	1998	2000	In active service	
Russian cruiser Rurik	Armoured cruiser	(Russia) Imperial Russian Navy	1905	1906	1930 (Decommissioned)	
TCG Muavenet / HMS Inconstant	I-class destroyer	Turkish Navy / Royal Navy	1939	1941	1960 (Decommissioned)	
TS Dufferin	Troopship	(India) Indian Government		1904	1927 to Indian Department of Commerce for Indian Merchantile Marine training until 1972 and broken up 1976 in Darukhana, Bombay	

=== Submarines ===
See here for every U-class submarine built in Barrow-in-Furness for the British, French, Netherlands, Polish and Soviet Navies.

Name	Class	Built For	Laid down	Launched	Fate	Image
Brazilian submarine Humaitá	Oberon class	Brazilian Navy	3 November 1970	15 October 1971	Decommissioned in 1996	
Brazilian submarine Riachuelo	Oberon class	Brazilian Navy		6 September 1975	Museum ship in Rio de Janeiro since 1997	
Brazilian submarine Tonelero	Oberon class	Brazilian Navy	18 November 1971	22 November 1972	Decommissioned in 1996	
HMS A1	A class	Royal Navy	19 February 1902	9 July 1902	Lost 1911. Wreck rediscovered 1989	
HMS A10	A class	Royal Navy				
HMS A11	A class	Royal Navy		8 March 1905	Scrapped in May 1920	
HMS A12	A class	Royal Navy				
HMS A13	A class	Royal Navy				
HMS A2	A class	Royal Navy		15 April 1903	Scrapped in January 1920	
HMS A3	A class	Royal Navy		13 July 1904	12 May 1912 sunk as gunnery target	
HMS A4	A class	Royal Navy	9 June 1903	17 July 1904	Sold for scrapping 16 January 1920	
HMS A5	A class	Royal Navy	19 February 1902	11 February 1905	Scrapped in 1920 at Portsmouth Dockyard	
HMS A6	A class	Royal Navy				
HMS A7	A class	Royal Navy	19 February 1903		Sunk in Whitsand Bay on 16 January 1914	
HMS A8	A class	Royal Navy		23 January 1905	Scrapped in 1920	
HMS A9	A class	Royal Navy				
HMAS AE1	E class	Royal Australian Navy	14 November 1911	22 May 1913	Lost at Sea 14 September 1914	
HMAS AE2	E class	Royal Australian Navy	10 February 1912	18 June 1913	Scuttled 29 April 1915	
HMS Agamemnon (S123)	Astute class	Royal Navy	18 July 2013	3 October 2024	Pre-sea trials	
HMS Agincourt (S125)	Astute class	Royal Navy	14 May 2018		Under construction	
HMS Alcide	Amphion class	Royal Navy	2 January 1945	12 April 1945	Sold to be broken up for scrap in 1974	
HMS Alderney	Amphion class	Royal Navy	6 February 1945	25 June 1945	Sold to be broken up for scrap in 1972	
HMS Alliance	Amphion class	Royal Navy	13 March 1945	28 July 1945	Museum ship/memorial since 1981 at Royal Navy Submarine Museum	
HMS Ambush	Amphion class	Royal Navy	17 May 1945	24 September 1945	Sold to be broken up for scrap in 1971	
HMS Ambush (S120)	Astute class	Royal Navy	22 October 2003	6 January 2011	In active Royal Navy service	
HMS Amphion	Amphion class	Royal Navy	31 August 1944	27 March 1945	Sold to be broken up for scrap in 1971	
HMS Anchorite	Amphion class	Royal Navy	22 January 1946	18 November 1947	Sold to be broken up for scrap in 1970	
HMS Andrew (P423)	Amphion class	Royal Navy	13 August 1945	6 April 1946	Sold to be broken up for scrap in 1977	
HMS Anson (S123)	Astute class	Royal Navy	13 October 2011	20 April 2021	In active Royal Navy service	
HMS Artful (S121)	Astute class	Royal Navy	11 March 2005	17 May 2014	In active Royal Navy service	
HMS Astute (P447)	Amphion class	Royal Navy		1944	Scrapped in 1970	
HMS Astute (S119)	Astute class	Royal Navy	31 January 2001	8 June 2007	In active Royal Navy service	
HMS Auriga (P419)	Amphion class	Royal Navy	7 June 1944	29 March 1945	Sold to be broken up for scrap in 1974	
HMS Aurochs (P426)	Amphion class	Royal Navy	21 June 1944	28 July 1945	Sold to be broken up for scrap in 1967	
HMS Audacious (S122)	Astute class	Royal Navy	24 March 2009	28 April 2017	In active Royal Navy service	
HMS B1	B class	Royal Navy		25 October 1904	Relegated to training duties after World War I. She was sold for scrap in May 1921	
HMS B2	B class	Royal Navy				
HMS B3	B class	Royal Navy				
HMS B4	B class	Royal Navy				
HMS B5	B class	Royal Navy				
HMS B6	B class	Royal Navy				
HMS B7	B class	Royal Navy				
HMS B8	B class	Royal Navy				
HMS B9	B class	Royal Navy				
HMS B10	B class	Royal Navy				
HMS B11	B class	Royal Navy				
HMS C1	C class	Royal Navy				
HMS C2	C class	Royal Navy				
HMS C3	C class	Royal Navy				
HMS C4	C class	Royal Navy				
HMS C5	C class	Royal Navy				
HMS C6	C class	Royal Navy				
HMS C7	C class	Royal Navy				
HMS C8	C class	Royal Navy				
HMS C9	C class	Royal Navy				
HMS C10	C class	Royal Navy				
HMS C11	C class	Royal Navy				
HMS C12	C class	Royal Navy				
HMS C13	C class	Royal Navy				
HMS C14	C class	Royal Navy				
HMS C15	C class	Royal Navy				
HMS C16	C class	Royal Navy				
HMS C21	C class	Royal Navy	4 February 1908		Sold 5 December 1921	
HMS C22	C class	Royal Navy				
HMS C23	C class	Royal Navy				
HMS C24	C class	Royal Navy				
HMS C25	C class	Royal Navy				
HMS C26	C class	Royal Navy				
HMS C27	C class	Royal Navy				
HMS C28	C class	Royal Navy				
HMS C29	C class	Royal Navy				
HMS C30	C class	Royal Navy				
HMS C31	C class	Royal Navy				
HMS C32	C class	Royal Navy				
HMS C35	C class	Royal Navy				
HMS C36	C class	Royal Navy				
HMS C37	C class	Royal Navy				
HMS C38	C class	Royal Navy				
Captain Thompson		Chilean Navy		15 January 1929		
HMCS Chicoutimi (SSK 879)	Upholder/Victoria class	Royal Navy / Royal Canadian Navy	November 1983	2 December 1986	in active service for Canada (Dry-docked)	
Delfim		Portuguese Navy	1933	1 May 1934		
HMS Dreadnought	Nuclear-powered	Royal Navy	12 June 1959	21 October 1960	As of 2004, is laid up at Rosyth	
HMS Dreadnought	Dreadnought class	Royal Navy	6 October 2016		Under Construction	
HMS E4	E class	Royal Navy	16 May 1911	5 February 1912	Sold on 21 February 1922	
Espardarte		Portuguese Navy	1933	30 May 1934		
HMS Excalibur	Explorer class	Royal Navy		25 February 1955	Scrapped in March 1968	
HMS Explorer	Explorer class	Royal Navy		5 March 1954	Scrapped in March 1962	
INS Gal	Gal class	Israeli Navy		2 December 1975	Preserved as a museum ship since 2007	
Golfino		Portuguese Navy	1933	30 May 1934		
Holland 4	Holland class	Royal Navy	1902		Foundered on 3 September 1912. She was salvaged and was used as a gunnery target in 1914	
HMS K26	K class	Royal Navy		26 August 1919	Sold for scrapping March 1931 to Mamo Brothers, Malta	
HMS K3	K class	Royal Navy	21 May 1915	20 May 1916	sold for scrapping in 1921	
HMS K4	K class	Royal Navy	28 June 1915		K4 was sunk on 31 January 1918 during exercises with the 13th submarine flotilla	
Kalev		Estonian Navy	27 July 1935	7 July 1936	Missing after 29 October 1941	
HMS L1	L class	Royal Navy	18 May 1916	1917	Sold in March 1930 and scrapped in Newport	
HMS L2	L class	Royal Navy		1917	Scrapped in 1930	
HMS L3	L class	Royal Navy		1917	Scrapped in 1931	
HMS L4	L class	Royal Navy		1917	Scrapped in 1932	
HMS L11	L class	Royal Navy		1918	Broken up in 1932	
HMS L12	L class	Royal Navy		1918	Broken up in 1932	
HMS L14	L class	Royal Navy		1918	Broken up in 1934	
HMS L17	L class	Royal Navy		1918	Broken up in 1934	
HMS L18	L class	Royal Navy		1918	Broken up in 1936	
HMS L19	L class	Royal Navy		1919	Broken up in 1937	
HMS L20	L class	Royal Navy		1918	Broken up in 1935	
HMS L21	L class	Royal Navy		1919	Broken up in 1939	
HMS L22	L class	Royal Navy		1919	Broken up in 1935	
HMS L24	L class	Royal Navy		1919	Sunk in collision with HMS Resolution, 14 January 1924	
HMS L25	L class	Royal Navy		1919	Broken Up in 1935	
Kalev	Kalev class	Estonian Navy	1 May 1935	7 July 1936	Commissioned in the Soviet Navy in 1940, sunk in 1941	
Lembit	Kalev class	Estonian Navy	27 July 1935	7 July 1936	Commissioned in the Soviet Navy in 1940, museum ship since 1979 in Tallinn, Estonia	
HMS M1	M class	Royal Navy	1916	9 July 1917	Sunk during exercise off the Devon coast after colliding with Swedish Collier SS Vidar – All crew members were lost.	
HMS M2	M class	Royal Navy	1916	15 April 1919	Lost off Chesil Beach on 26 January 1933, now a popular scuba diving location.	
HMS Narwhal (N45)	Grampus class	Royal Navy		29 August 1935	Sunk 23 July 1940	
HMS Narwhal	Porpoise class	Royal Navy		25 October 1957	Sunk as a target on 3 August 1983	
ORP Sokół / HMS Urchin (N97)	U class	Polish Navy / Royal Navy	9 December 1939	30 September 1940	Scrapped in 1949	
TCG Burak Reis	Oruç Reis class	Turkish Navy		19 October 1940	Scrapped in 1957	
TCG Murat Reis	Oruç Reis class	Turkish Navy		20 July 1940	Scrapped in 1957	
TCG Oruç Reis	Oruç Reis class	Turkish Navy		19 July 1940	Scrapped in 1957	
TCG Uluc Ali Reis	Oruç Reis class	Turkish Navy		1 November 1940	Sunk by U-boat U-123 near Sierra Leone	
ORP Dzik	U class	Polish Navy	30 December 1941	11 November 1942	Scrapped in 1958	
ORP Dzik / HDMS U-1 / HDMS Springeren	U class	Polish Navy / Royal Danish Navy / Royal Navy	30 December 1941	11 November 1942	Scrapped in 1958	
HMS Olympus (S12)	Oberon class	Royal Navy	4 March 1960	14 June 1961	Scrapped in 2011	
HMS Orpheus (S11)	Oberon class	Royal Navy	8 April 1959	17 November 1959	Scrapped in 1994	
HMS Osiris (S13)	Oberon class	Royal Navy	1962	1964	Scrapped in 1991	
HMS Otway	Odin class	Royal Australian Navy	March 1925	7 September 1926	Scrapped in 1945	
HMS Oxley	Odin class	Royal Australian Navy / Royal Navy		29 June 1926	Torpedoed in a 'friendly fire' situation by another Barrow-built submarine – HMS Triton (N15) – near Norway on 10 September 1939 with only 3 survivors	
HMS P32 (1940)	U class	Royal Navy	30 April 1940	15 December 1940	Mined on 18 August 1941 near Tripoli with the loss of 8 crew	
HMS P33 (1941)	U class	Royal Navy	18 June 1940	28 January 1941	Sunk, probably during depth charge attack 18 August 1941	
HMS P48 (1942)	U class	Royal Navy	21 August 1941	15 April 1942	Depth charged in the Gulf of Tunis, 25 December 1942	
HMS Pandora (N42)	Parthian class	Royal Navy		1929	Sunk at Valletta, Malta, by Italian aircraft on 1 April 1942 during World War I	
HMS Perseus (N36)	Parthian class	Royal Navy	2 July 1928	22 May 1929	Struck an Italian mine on 6 December 1941 near Cephalonia with the loss of 60 crew	
HMS Porpoise (S01)	Porpoise class	Royal Navy	1956	25 April 1956	Sunk as a target in 1985	
HMS Poseidon (1929)	Parthian class	Royal Navy		22 August 1929	Collided with the Chinese merchant steamer SS Yula on 9 June 1931 with the loss of 22 crew	
HMS Proteus (N29)	Parthian class	Royal Navy		23 July 1929	Scrapped in March 1946 at Troon	
HMS R7	R class	Royal Navy	1 November 1917	14 May 1918	Sold on 21 February 1923 to E Suren	
HMS R8	R class	Royal Navy	1 November 1917	28 June 1918	Sold on 21 February 1923 to E Suren	
Rahav	Gal class	Israeli Navy Israeli Navy		Late 1970s	Decommissioned in early 2000s	
HMS Repulse (S23)	Resolution class	Royal Navy		4 November 1967	Decommissioned in 1996	
HMS Resolution (S22)	Resolution class	Royal Navy	26 February 1964	15 September 1966	Decommissioned in October 1994	
HMS Rorqual (S02)	Porpoise class	Royal Navy		5 December 1956	Broken up in 1977	
HMS Sceptre (S104)	Swiftsure class	Royal Navy	19 February 1974	20 November 1976	Decommissioned in 2010	
HMS Seraph (P219)	S class	Royal Navy	16 August 1940	25 October 1941	Scrapped in December 1965, parts from her conning tower were preserved as a memorial at the Citadel in Charleston, South Carolina. The only place where the Royal Navy ensign is allowed to fly in the United States	
HMS Sovereign (S108)	Swiftsure class	Royal Navy	18 September 1970	17 February 1973	Paid off	
HMS Spartan (S105)	Swiftsure class	Royal Navy	26 April 1976	7 May 1978	Paid off	
HMS Splendid (S106)	Swiftsure class	Royal Navy		5 October 1979	Decommissioned in 2004	
HMS Superb (S109)	Swiftsure class	Royal Navy	16 March 1972	30 November 1974	Decommissioned	
HMS Swiftsure (S126)	Swiftsure class	Royal Navy		7 September 1971	Decommissioned in 1992	
HMS Talent (S92)	Trafalgar class	Royal Navy	13 May 1986	15 April 1988	In active service as of 2010	
Tanin	Gal class	Israeli Navy		Late 1970s	Decommissioned in early 2000s	
HMS Tapir (P335) / HNLMS Zeehond	T class	Royal Navy / Royal Netherlands Navy	29 March 1943	21 August 1944	Scrapped at Faslane in December 1966	
HMS Tireless (S88)	Trafalgar class	Royal Navy	6 June 1981	17 March 1984	Active in service as of 2010	
HMS Torbay (S90)	Trafalgar class	Royal Navy	3 December 1982	8 March 1985	Active in service as of 2010	
HMS Trafalgar (S107)	Trafalgar class	Royal Navy	15 April 1979	1 July 1981	Decommissioned in 2009	
HMS Trenchant (S91)	Trafalgar class	Royal Navy	28 October 1985	3 November 1986	Active in service as of 2010	
HMS Triton (N15)	T class	Royal Navy	28 August 1936	5 October 1937	sunk, either by Italian torpedo boats or mines in the Strait of Otranto – involved in the HMS Oxley incident	
HMS Triumph (N18)	T class	Royal Navy		1938	Hit a mine off the coast of Greece in early January 1942 with the loss of all 59 crew	
HMS Triumph (S93)	Trafalgar class	Royal Navy	2 February 1987	16 February 1991	Active in service as of 2010	
HMS Trump (P333)	T class	Royal Navy	31 December 1942	25 March 1944	Scrapped at Newport, Wales in 1971	
HMS Turbulent (S87)	Trafalgar class	Royal Navy	8 May 1980	1 December 1982	Active in service as of 2010	
HMS Umbra (P35)	U class	Royal Navy	19 July 1940	15 March 1941	Sold for scrap in 1946, broken up at Blyth	
HMS Umpire (N82)	U class	Royal Navy	1 January 1940	30 December 1940	Sunk in collision on 19 July 1941 with the loss of 22 men	
HMS Unbeaten (N93)	U class	Royal Navy	22 November 1939	9 July 1940	Sunk on 11 November 1942 in friendly-fire incident	
HMS Undaunted (N55)	U class	Royal Navy	2 December 1939	20 August 1940	Sunk 11 May 1941	
HMS Undine (N48)	U class	Royal Navy	19 February 1937	5 October 1937	Sunk on 7 January 1940	
HMS Union (N56)	U class	Royal Navy	9 December 1939	1 October 1940	Sunk on 20 July 1941	
HMS Unique (N95)	U class	Royal Navy	30 October 1939	6 June 1940	Sunk around 10 October 1942	
HMS Unity (N66)	U class	Royal Navy	19 February 1937	16 February 1938	Sunk on 29 April 1940	
HMS Upholder (P37)	U class	Royal Navy	30 October 1939	8 July 1940	Sunk on or about 14 April 1942	
HMS Upholder (S40)	Type 2400	Royal Navy	November 1983	2 December 1986	Commissioned Royal Navy 7 December 1990. Decommissioned 29 April 1994. Sold to Canadian Navy in 1998 and handed over in 2004. Currently commissioned as HMCS Chicoutimi (Oct 2004). Sustained fire damage in transit to Canada. Returning to service in 2014 after three years of work at Victoria Shipyard Co. Ltd. in Esquimalt.	
HMS Upright (N89)	U class	Royal Navy	6 November 1939	21 April 1940	Scrapped March 1946	
HMS Urge (N17)	U class	Royal Navy	30 October 1939	19 August 1940	Sunk 29 April 1942	
HMS Ursula / V-4	U class	Royal Navy / Soviet Navy	19 February 1937	16 February 1938	Scrapped in May 1950	
HMS Usk (N65)	U class	Royal Navy	6 November 1939	7 June 1940	Scrapped on 29 April 1942	
HMS Utmost (N19)	U class	Royal Navy	2 November 1939	20 April 1940	Torpedoed and sunk on 25 November 1942	
Valiant	Dreadnought class	Royal Navy	10 December 2020		Under Construction	
HMS Vampire (P72)	V class	Royal Navy	9 November 1942	20 July 1943	Scrapped at Gateshead in 1950	
HMS Vandal (P64)	U class	Royal Navy	17 March 1942	23 November 1942	The submarine probably had the shortest career of any Royal Navy submarine, being lost with all 37 on-board just four days after commissioning (north of the Isle of Arran)	
HMS Vanguard (S28)	Vanguard class	Royal Navy	3 September 1986	4 March 1992	Active in service as of 2010	
HMS Vengeance (S31)	Vanguard class	Royal Navy	9 September 1998	27 November 1999	Active in service as of 2010	
HMS Venturer / HNoMS Utstein	V class	Royal Navy / Royal Norwegian Navy	25 August 1942	4 May 1943	Scrapped in Sweden in 1964	
HMS Victorious (S29)	Vanguard class	Royal Navy		September 1993	Active in service as of 2010	
HMS Vigilant (S30)	Vanguard class	Royal Navy		October 1995	Active in service as of 2010	
Warspite	Dreadnought class	Royal Navy	9 February 2023		Under Construction	

=== Civilian ships ===
==== Ocean liners and passenger ships ====
Name	Class	Built For	Laid down	Launched	Fate	Image
17 de Octobre	Passenger Cargo Ship	(Argentina) Argentine Government	1948 (1 December)	1950 (4 April)		
Accra	Passenger Cargo Ship	(United Kingdom) Elder Dempster	1945 (3 December)	1947 (24 February)		
RMS Antonia	Passenger liner	(United Kingdom) Cunard	1920	1921 (11 March)	Scrapped in 1948	
Apapa	Passenger Cargo Ship	(United Kingdom) Elder Dempster	1946 (2 January)	1948		
Awatea	Passenger liner	(New Zealand) Union Steam Ship Company of NZ	1935	1936 (25 February)	Attacked near Bougie by German bombers and sank during the night (1942)	
HMS Ben-my-Chree	Passenger Ferry / Seaplane carrier	Isle of Man Steam Packet Company	1907	1908 (23 March)	Sunk on 11 January 1917 by shore-based Turkish artillery fire	
RMS Carinthia	Passenger liner	(United Kingdom) Cunard	1924	1925 (24 February)	Sunk by a U-boat off the coast of Ireland in 1940	
Chusan	Passenger liner	(United Kingdom) P&O Steam Navigation Co	1947	28 June 1949		
SS City of Rome	Passenger liner	(United Kingdom) Inman Line		1881 (14 June)	Scrapped in 1902	
Copenhagen	Passenger liner	(Denmark) Nordline	–	1972	Completed in Newcastle by Swan Hunter. By the time the ship was delivered to Nordline, the company was having financial difficulties and sold her to the Black Sea Shipping Co, where she was renamed Odessa. Scrapped in Bangladesh 2007.	
Eva Peron	Passenger Cargo Ship	(Argentina) Argentine Government	1 December 1947	25 August 1949		
Fenella	Passenger steamer	Isle of Man Steam Packet Company	May 1936	1937		
Himalaya	Steamship / Cruise liner	(United Kingdom) (India) Steamship route (Tilbury – Mumbai – Australia) / P&O Steam Navigation Co		5 October 1948	Broken up in 1974 in Taiwan	
Hinemoa	Passenger Cargo Ship	(New Zealand) Union Steam Ship Company of NZ	1945	30 May 1946	12 February 1971 sold to Fuji Marden & Co Ltd, Hong Kong, where she was towed in March by the tug Salvonia and scrapped.	
Hobson's Bay	Passenger liner	(Australia) Commonwealth Line		4 October 1921		
Kedah	Passenger cargo ship	Straits Steamship Company, Singapore	1926	16 July 1927		
TSS Lady of Mann	Passenger steamer	Isle of Man Steam Packet Company		4 March 1930		
SS Mayon	Passenger cargo ship	(Philippines) Philippine Steamship Company		26 June 1930		
HMHS Newfoundland	Passenger cargo ship	(United Kingdom) Johnston Warren Lines		24 January 1925	Converted to Hospital ship in 1940, bombed and sunk off Salerno in 1943 with the loss of 38 lives	
RMS Nova Scotia	Passenger cargo ship	(United Kingdom) Johnston Warren Lines		1926	Converted to troopship in 1941, torpedoed and sunk in the Indian Ocean SE off Natal Province in 1942, while carrying Italian prisoners: 858 lives lost	
RMS Orama	Passenger liner	(United Kingdom) Orient Steam Navigation Company	1923	20 May 1924	Converted to troopship in 1940, sunk west of Narvik in June 1940, 19 crew were lost and 280 were taken prisoner	
RMS Orcades	Passenger liner	(United Kingdom) Orient Steam Navigation Company		14 October 1947	Broken up in Kaohsiung in 1973 after being gutted by a fire in Hong Kong in 1972	
RMS/HMS Orford	Passenger liner	(United Kingdom) Orient Steam Navigation Company		27 September 1927	Converted to troopship in 1939, bombed and beached at Marseille in 1940 while evacuating troops from France, refloated and scrapped in 1947	
Oriana	Ocean liner	(United Kingdom) Orient Steam Navigation Company	18 September 1956	3 November 1959	Broken up for scrap 2005	
RMS Orion	Passenger liner	(United Kingdom) Orient Steam Navigation Company		7 February 1934	Converted to troopship in 1941, damaged in collision with HMS Revenge but repaired. Scrapped in Belgium 1963	
Orizaba	Passenger liner	(United Kingdom) Pacific Steam Navigation Company		1886	Ran aground and wrecked off Sydney in 1905	
Oronsay	Passenger liner	(United Kingdom) Orient Steam Navigation Company	1949	30 June 1950	Transferred to P&O Steam Navigation Co in 1963, scrapped in Taiwan in 1975	
Orotava	Passenger liner	(United Kingdom) Pacific Steam Navigation Company		1889	Sunk in 1896 but raised and reconditioned. Transferred to many other companies and eventually scrapped in 1919	
Oroya	Passenger liner	(United Kingdom) Pacific Steam Navigation Company		31 August 1886	Ran aground in the Bay of Naples in 1895 – severely damaged but repaired – Transferred to Royal Mail Steam Packet Company and scrapped in Genoa in 1909	
SS Orsova	Passenger liner	(United Kingdom) Orient Steam Navigation Company	1952	14 May 1953	Transferred to P&O Line ownership in 1965, scrapped in 1974	
Ortona / Arcadian	Passenger liner	(United Kingdom) Orient Line – Pacific Steam Navigation Company		1899	Torpedoed in the Eastern Mediterranean while en route from Salonika to Alexandria with troops (as a troopship) – 279 lives were lost	
Oruba / Orion	Passenger liner	(United Kingdom) Pacific Steam Navigation Company		1889	Purchased by the British Admiralty in 1914 and rebuilt to represent the battleship, HMS Orion, she was scuttled at Mudros Harbour, Lemnos Island, Greece as a breakwater in 1915	
Otranto	Passenger liner	(United Kingdom) Pacific Steam Navigation Company		9 June 1925	Scrapped at Faslane, Scotland in 1957	
Presidente Peron	Passenger Cargo Ship	(Argentina) Argentine Government		3 November 1948		
Queen of Bermuda	Passenger liner	(United Kingdom) Furness Withy	Started construction in Walker-on-Tyne	1 September 1932	sold for scrap in 1966	
Rangatira	Passenger liner	(New Zealand) Union Steam Ship Company of NZ		16 April 1931	Scrapped in 1967	
RMS Scythia	Passenger liner	(United Kingdom) Cunard	1919	23 March 1920	Scrapped in 1958	
RMS Strathaird	Passenger liner	(United Kingdom) P&O Steam Navigation Co		18 July 1931	Scrapped in Hong Kong in 1961	
SS Strathallan	Passenger liner	(United Kingdom) P&O Steam Navigation Co		23 September 1937	Damaged by torpedo in the Mediterranean on 21 December 1942, a fire the following day capsized and sunk the ship	
SS Stratheden	Passenger liner	(United Kingdom) P&O Steam Navigation Co			Scrapped in Italy in 1969	
RMS Strathmore	Passenger liner	(United Kingdom) P&O Steam Navigation Co		4 April 1935	Scrapped in Italy in 1969	
RMS Strathnaver	Passenger liner	(United Kingdom) P&O Steam Navigation Co		5 February 1931	Scrapped in Hong Kong in 1962	

==== Oil, gas and LNG tankers ====
Name	Class	Built For	Laid down	Launched	Fate	Image
British Admiral	Oil tanker	(United Kingdom) BP	1963	1965 (17 March)		
British Adventure	Oil tanker	(United Kingdom) BP	1950	1950 (12 December)		
British Ambassador	Oil tanker	(United Kingdom) BP	1957	1958 (16 August)		
British Faith	Oil tanker	(United Kingdom) BP	1956	1957 (10 December)		
British Glory	Oil tanker	(United Kingdom) BP	1956	1957		
British Grenadier	Oil tanker	(United Kingdom) BP	1961	1962 (16 August)		
British Prestige	Oil tanker	(United Kingdom) BP	1958 (23 October)	1961 (28 July)		
British Sovereign	Oil tanker	(United Kingdom) BP	1953 (27 March)	1954 (31 August)		
British Victory	Oil tanker	(United Kingdom) BP	1953	1955		
Esso Canterbury	Oil tanker	(United States) (United Kingdom) (Canada) Esso	30 May 1952	24 September 1953		
Esso Westminster	Oil tanker	(United States) (United Kingdom) (Canada) Esso	29 February 1952	24 September 1953		
Estrella Patagonica / Voluta / San Casimiro	Oil tanker	Shell Compania Argentina de Petroleo SA		1962	Scrapped Bombay in 1989	
Eugenia Niarchos	Oil tanker	(Greece) Niarchos Group (Neptune Tanker Corporation)	May 1955	1956		
Ficus / Empire Grenadier	Oil tanker	(United Kingdom) Shell Tankers U.K.		1942	Scrapped in 1960	
Hinea	Oil tanker	(United Kingdom) Shell		1956	Scrapped in 1976	
Hinnites	Oil tanker	(United Kingdom) Shell		1956	Scrapped in 1975	
Humilaria / San Edmundo	Oil tanker	(United Kingdom) Eagle Oil		1958	Scrapped in 1973	
Kennerleya / Empire Granite	Oil tanker	(United Kingdom) Shell UK		1941	Scrapped in 1960	
Marinula / Santa Margherita / Trigonia	Oil tanker	(United Kingdom) Eagle Oil		1916	Scrapped Newport in 1951	
Methane Princess	LNG carrier	(United Kingdom) British Gas			Scrapped in 1998	
Narragansett	Oil tanker	(United Kingdom) (United States) Anglo-American Oil Company	1919	1920		
Rebeca	Oil tanker	(Netherlands Antilles) Antilles Curaçaosche Scheepvaart Maatschappij		1938	Scrapped in 1954	
Rosalia	Oil tanker	(Netherlands Antilles) Antilles Curaçaosche Scheepvaart Maatschappij		1938	Sunk in 1943	
San Calisto / Vermetus	Oil tanker	(United Kingdom) Eagle Oil / (United Kingdom) Shell UK		1959	Scrapped in 1975	
San Conrado / Valvata	Oil tanker	(United Kingdom) Eagle Oil / (United Kingdom) Shell UK		1960	Scrapped in 1975	
San Gregorio / Vitta	Oil tanker	(United Kingdom) Eagle Oil	July 1956	1957	Scrapped in 1975	
San Patricio / Pecten	Oil tanker	Shell Compania Argentina de Petroleo SA / (United Kingdom) Eagle Oil		1955	Scrapped in 1986	
Serenia	Oil tanker	(United Kingdom) Shell		1961	Scrapped in 1987	
SS Spyros Niarchos	Oil tanker	(Liberia) Niarchos Group	1955	1956	Scrapped in 1977	

==== Cargo ships and other vessels ====
Name	Class	Built For	Laid down	Launched	Fate	Image
Affonso Penna	Floating dry dock	(Brazil) Brazilian Government		1910 (7 June)		
Anglia	Cable Ship	(United Kingdom) Telegraph Construction and Maintenance Company		1898 (20 June)		
Aries	Steam Yacht	(United Kingdom) Sir James Ramsden		1873	Wrecked at Hollyhead 29 March 1880	
Carl Schmedeman	Cargo ship	(Canada) Tropical Steamship Company, Toronto	1 June 1951	12 May 1952		
Duke of Connaught	Floating dry dock	(Canada) Canadian Vickers, Montreal	1912	1912		
Duke of Devonshire	Screw Barque	(United Kingdom) Eastern Steam Ships Co Ltd		1873 (25 Jun)		
HMCS Earl Grey	Ice breaker	(Canada) Canadian Government		June 1909		
Empire Admiral	Cargo ship	(United Kingdom) Ministry of War Transport		26 March 1945	Scrapped in Taiwan, March 1969	
Empire Athelstan	Heavy lift ship	(United Kingdom) Ministry of War Transport		15 January 1946	Scrapped in Yugoslavia, January 1976	
Empire Charmian	Heavy lift ship	(United Kingdom) Ministry of War Transport		25 November 1942	Scrapped in India, March 1962	
HMS Exmouth / HMS Worcester	School ship	(United Kingdom) Metropolitan Asylums Board		4 April 1905	Accommodation for the Royal Navy at Scapa Flow	
Geraldine Mary	Cargo ship	(United Kingdom) (Dominion of Newfoundland) Anglo-Newfoundland Shipping Company		19 August 1924		
JH Hunter	Sludge vessel	(United Kingdom) London County Council		2 October 1924		
Kurtuluş	Cargo ship	(Turkey) Cargo ship (also transported food in the 1941–42 Greek famine)		1883	Ran aground and sunk near Marmara Island	
Modavia	Cargo ship	(United Kingdom) Donaldson Line	1925	23 September 1926	Torpedoed and sunk by E-boat in Lyme Bay in 1943	
Moreton Bay	Cargo ship	(United Kingdom) Donaldson Line		1921		
Moveria	Cargo ship	(United Kingdom) Donaldson Line		10 October 1924	Broken up in 1952	

== Key facts ==
- The largest ship ever to be built in Barrow was the 103,000-ton oil tanker British Admiral. She was the first of her size to ever be built in Britain and even held the title of being the world's largest ship for a short time.
- The largest liner built at Barrow was Oriana. She was 804 ft long (245 m), 97 ft wide (30 m) and weighed 41,910 tons. She had a speed capable of reaching 30.64 knots (56.75 km/h; 35.26 mph), and was also the first liner to be fitted with transverse propulsion.
- The largest navy ship built in Barrow was Battleship HMS Revenge. Her Full load displacement was just over 36,000 tons.
- The largest loss of life on a Barrow-built ship was on 28 November 1942, when RMS Nova Scotia acting as a troop ship during World War II was torpedoed off the coast of South Africa by a German submarine, killing 858. This is closely followed by the events of 9 July 1917, when 843 men were killed in the UK's worst ever explosion on board HMS Vanguard.
- The most recent Barrow-built vessel to be lost during a military campaign occurred in 1982 during the Falkland War when HMS Sheffield was attacked and sunk by the Argentine Navy.
- The first ship to be built in Barrow was Jane Roper, which was launched in 1852, and Barrow's first steamship, a 3,000-ton liner named Duke of Devonshire, was launched in 1873.
- The most successful British submarine of World War II was built in Barrow. HMS Upholder completed 24 patrols, sinking around 120,000 tons of enemy shipping, including the Italian destroyer Libeccio after the Battle of the Duisburg Convoy and the 18,000-ton Italian liner SS Conte Rosso.

=== Notables to launch vessels ===
==== 20th century ====
- Elizabeth II
  - British Admiral
  - HMS Dreadnought
  - HMS Invincible
  - HMS Sheffield
  - HMS Ocean
- Winston Churchill
  - HMS Indomitable
- Princess Diana
  - HMS Vanguard
- Queen Elizabeth The Queen Mother
  - RMS Strathmore
- Princess Alexandra
  - SS Oriana
- Princess Louise
  - HMS Dominion
- Prince Arisugawa Takehito
  - Japanese battleship Katori

==== 21st century ====
- Princess Anne
  - HMS Albion
- Camilla, Duchess of Cornwall
  - HMS Astute
- Purnomo Yusgiantoro
  - KRI Bung Tomo (recommissioned)
  - KRI John Lie (recommissioned)

== See also ==
- Royal Navy Submarine Service
- List of submarines of the Royal Navy
