= Benalbanach (ship) =

Benalbanach was the name of five ships operated by the Ben Line.

1. SS Benalbanach (1940), in service 1940–43
2. SS Benalbanach (1946), in service 1947–63
3. MV Benalbanach, in service 1967–72
4. MV Benalbanach, in service 1974–78
5. MV Benalbanach, in service 1981–84

== Sources ==
- The Ships List
