= SS Benalbanach =

SS Benalbanach was the name of two ships operated by the Ben Line.

- SS Benalbanach (1940), sunk off Algiers in 1943 with the loss of 410 lives.
- SS Benalbanach (1946), ex-Empire Athelstan, served with Ben Line from 1947–63. Scrapped in 1975.
