= HMS L56 =

History

United Kingdom
- Name: HMS L56
- Builder: Fairfield Shipbuilding and Engineering Company, Govan
- Laid down: 16 October 1917
- Launched: 29 May 1919
- Fate: Sold for scrapping, 25 March 1938

General characteristics
- Class & type: L-class submarine
- Displacement: 960 long tons (980 t) surfaced; 1,150 long tons (1,170 t) submerged
- Length: 235 ft (71.6 m)
- Beam: 23 ft 6 in (7.2 m)
- Draught: 13 ft 2 in (4.0 m)
- Installed power: 2,400 bhp (1,800 kW) (diesel); 1,600 hp (1,200 kW) (electric)
- Propulsion: 2 × diesel engines; 2 × electric motors
- Speed: 17 kn (31 km/h; 20 mph) surfaced; 10.5 kn (19.4 km/h; 12.1 mph) submerged
- Range: 4,500 nmi (8,300 km; 5,200 mi) at 8 kn (15 km/h; 9.2 mph) on the surface
- Test depth: 150 feet (45.7 m)
- Complement: 44
- Armament: 6 × bow 21 in (533 mm) torpedo tubes; 2 × 4-inch deck guns

HMS L56 was a late-model L-class submarine built for the Royal Navy during the First World War. The boat was not completed before the end of the war and was sold for scrap in 1938.

== Design and description ==
L52 and its successors were modified to maximise the number of 21-inch (53.3 cm) torpedoes carried in the bow. The submarine had a length of 235 feet (71.6 m) overall, a beam of 23 feet 6 inches (7.2 m) and a mean draught of 13 feet 2 inches (4.0 m). They displaced 960 long tons (980 t) on the surface and 1,150 long tons (1,170 t) submerged. The L-class submarines had a crew of 44 officers and ratings. They had a diving depth of 150 feet (45.7 m).

For surface running, the boats were powered by two 12-cylinder Vickers 1,200-brake-horsepower (895 kW) diesel engines, each driving one propeller shaft. When submerged each propeller was driven by a 600-horsepower (447 kW) electric motor. They could reach 17 knots (31 km/h; 20 mph) on the surface and 10.5 knots (19.4 km/h; 12.1 mph) underwater. On the surface, the L class had a range of 4,200 nautical miles (7,800 km; 4,800 mi) at 10 knots (19 km/h; 12 mph).

The boats were armed with six 21-inch torpedo tubes in the bow. They carried eight reload torpedoes for a grand total of a dozen torpedoes. They were also armed with two 4-inch (102 mm) deck guns.

== Construction and career ==
HMS L56 was laid down on 16 October 1917 by Fairfield Shipbuilding and Engineering Company at their Govan shipyard, launched on 29 May 1919, and completed on 3 September 1919. The boat was sold for scrap on 25 March 1938.
