= HMS L14 =

British submarine

History

United Kingdom
- Name: HMS L14
- Builder: Vickers Limited, Barrow-in-Furness
- Laid down: 19 January 1917
- Launched: 10 June 1918
- Fate: Sold for scrapping, May 1934

General characteristics
- Class & type: L-class submarine
- Displacement: 914 long tons (929 t) surfaced; 1,089 long tons (1,106 t) submerged
- Length: 238 ft 7 in (72.7 m)
- Beam: 23 ft 6 in (7.2 m)
- Draught: 13 ft 3 in (4.0 m)
- Installed power: 2,400 bhp (1,800 kW) (diesel); 1,600 hp (1,200 kW) (electric)
- Propulsion: 2 × diesel engines; 2 × electric motors
- Speed: 17 kn (31 km/h; 20 mph) surfaced; 10.5 kn (19.4 km/h; 12.1 mph) submerged
- Range: 3,800 nmi (7,000 km; 4,400 mi) at 10 kn (19 km/h; 12 mph) on the surface
- Test depth: 150 feet (45.7 m)
- Complement: 38
- Armament: 4 × bow 21 in (533 mm) torpedo tubes; 2 × beam 18 in (457 mm) torpedo tubes; 1 × 4-inch deck gun; 16 mines

HMS L14 was a L-class submarine built for the Royal Navy during World War I. She was one of five boats in the class to be fitted as a minelayer. The boat survived the war and was sold for scrap in 1934.

== Design and description ==
L9 and its successors were enlarged to accommodate 21-inch (53.3 cm) torpedoes and more fuel. The submarine had a length of 238 feet 7 inches (72.7 m) overall, a beam of 23 feet 6 inches (7.2 m) and a mean draught of 13 feet 3 inches (4.0 m). They displaced 914 long tons (929 t) on the surface and 1,089 long tons (1,106 t) submerged. The L-class submarines had a crew of 38 officers and ratings.

For surface running, the boats were powered by two 12-cylinder Vickers 1,200-brake-horsepower (895 kW) diesel engines, each driving one propeller shaft. When submerged each propeller was driven by a 600-horsepower (447 kW) electric motor. They could reach 17 knots (31 km/h; 20 mph) on the surface and 10.5 knots (19.4 km/h; 12.1 mph) underwater. On the surface, the L class had a range of 3,800 nautical miles (7,000 km; 4,400 mi) at 10 knots (19 km/h; 12 mph).

The boats were armed with four 21-inch torpedo tubes in the bow and two 18-inch (45 cm) in broadside mounts. They carried four reload torpedoes for the 21-inch tubes for a grand total of ten torpedoes of all sizes. They were also armed with a 4-inch (102 mm) deck gun. L14 was fitted with 16 vertical mine chutes in her saddle tanks and carried one mine per chute.

== Construction and career ==
HMS L14 was built by Vickers, Barrow. She was laid down on 19 January 1917. The boat was sold to John Cashmore Ltd in May 1934 for scrapping at Newport. The periscope from L14 is preserved at the Royal Navy Submarine Museum at Gosport. It may be the only surviving example of a World War I periscope. It was manufactured by Grubb & Co. in 1918.
