= HMS L20 =

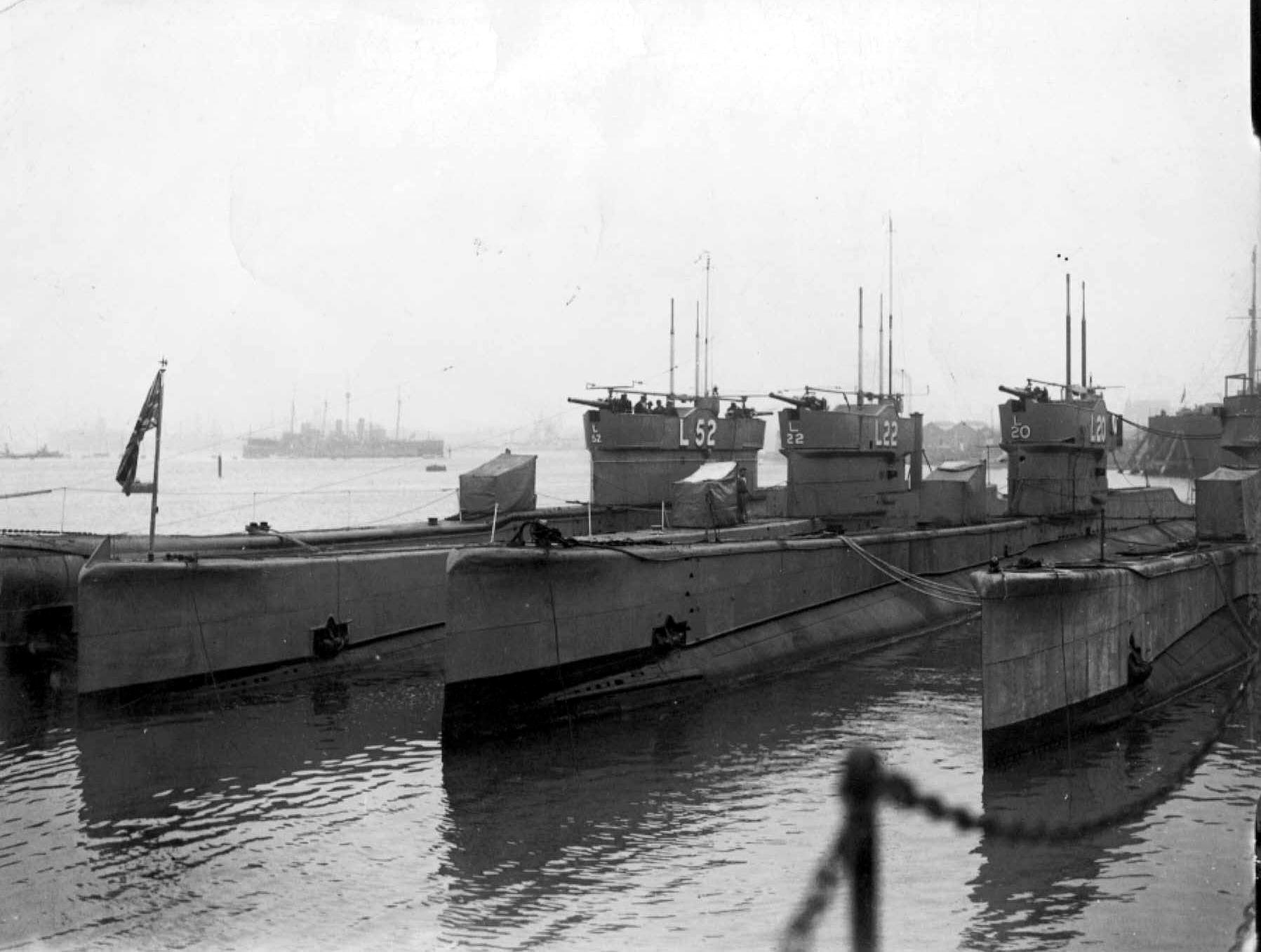
- L20 and three other L–class boats at Gosport (1933)

History

United Kingdom
- Name: HMS L20
- Builder: Vickers Limited, Barrow-in-Furness
- Laid down: 26 July 1917
- Launched: 23 September 1918
- Commissioned: 28 January 1919
- Fate: Sold for scrapping, 7 January 1935

General characteristics
- Class & type: L-class submarine
- Displacement: 914 long tons (929 t) surfaced; 1,089 long tons (1,106 t) submerged
- Length: 238 ft 7 in (72.7 m)
- Beam: 23 ft 6 in (7.2 m)
- Draught: 13 ft 3 in (4.0 m)
- Installed power: 2,400 bhp (1,800 kW) (diesel); 1,600 hp (1,200 kW) (electric)
- Propulsion: 2 × diesel engines; 2 × electric motors
- Speed: 17 kn (31 km/h; 20 mph) surfaced; 10.5 kn (19.4 km/h; 12.1 mph) submerged
- Range: 3,800 nmi (7,000 km; 4,400 mi) at 10 kn (19 km/h; 12 mph) on the surface
- Test depth: 150 feet (45.7 m)
- Complement: 38
- Armament: 4 × bow 21 in (533 mm) torpedo tubes; 2 × beam 18 in (457 mm) torpedo tubes; 1 × 4-inch deck gun

HMS L20 was a L-class submarine built for the Royal Navy during World War I. The boat was not completed before the end of the war and was sold for scrap in 1935.

== Design and description ==
L9 and its successors were enlarged to accommodate 21-inch (53.3 cm) torpedoes and more fuel. The submarine had a length of 238 feet 7 inches (72.7 m) overall, a beam of 23 feet 6 inches (7.2 m) and a mean draught of 13 feet 3 inches (4.0 m). They displaced 914 long tons (929 t) on the surface and 1,089 long tons (1,106 t) submerged. The L-class submarines had a crew of 38 officers and ratings. They had a diving depth of 150 feet (45.7 m).

For surface running, the boats were powered by two 12-cylinder Vickers 1,200-brake-horsepower (895 kW) diesel engines, each driving one propeller shaft. When submerged each propeller was driven by a 600-horsepower (447 kW) electric motor. They could reach 17 knots (31 km/h; 20 mph) on the surface and 10.5 knots (19.4 km/h; 12.1 mph) underwater. On the surface, the L class had a range of 3,800 nautical miles (7,000 km; 4,400 mi) at 10 knots (19 km/h; 12 mph).

The boats were armed with four 21-inch torpedo tubes in the bow and two 18-inch (45 cm) in broadside mounts. They carried four reload torpedoes for the 21-inch tubes for a grand total of ten torpedoes of all sizes. They were also armed with a 4-inch (102 mm) deck gun.

== Construction and career ==
HMS L20 was laid down on 26 July 1917 by Vickers at their Barrow-in-Furness shipyard, launched on 23 September 1918, and completed on 28 January 1919. L20 was assigned to the 4th Submarine Flotilla and HMS Titania in 1919 and sailed to Hong Kong, arriving on 14 April 1920. She was transferred to the reserve flotilla in 1923 in Hong Kong. She was sold to John Cashmore Ltd on 7 January 1935 for breaking up at Newport. Her bell is in the Royal Navy Submarine Museum.

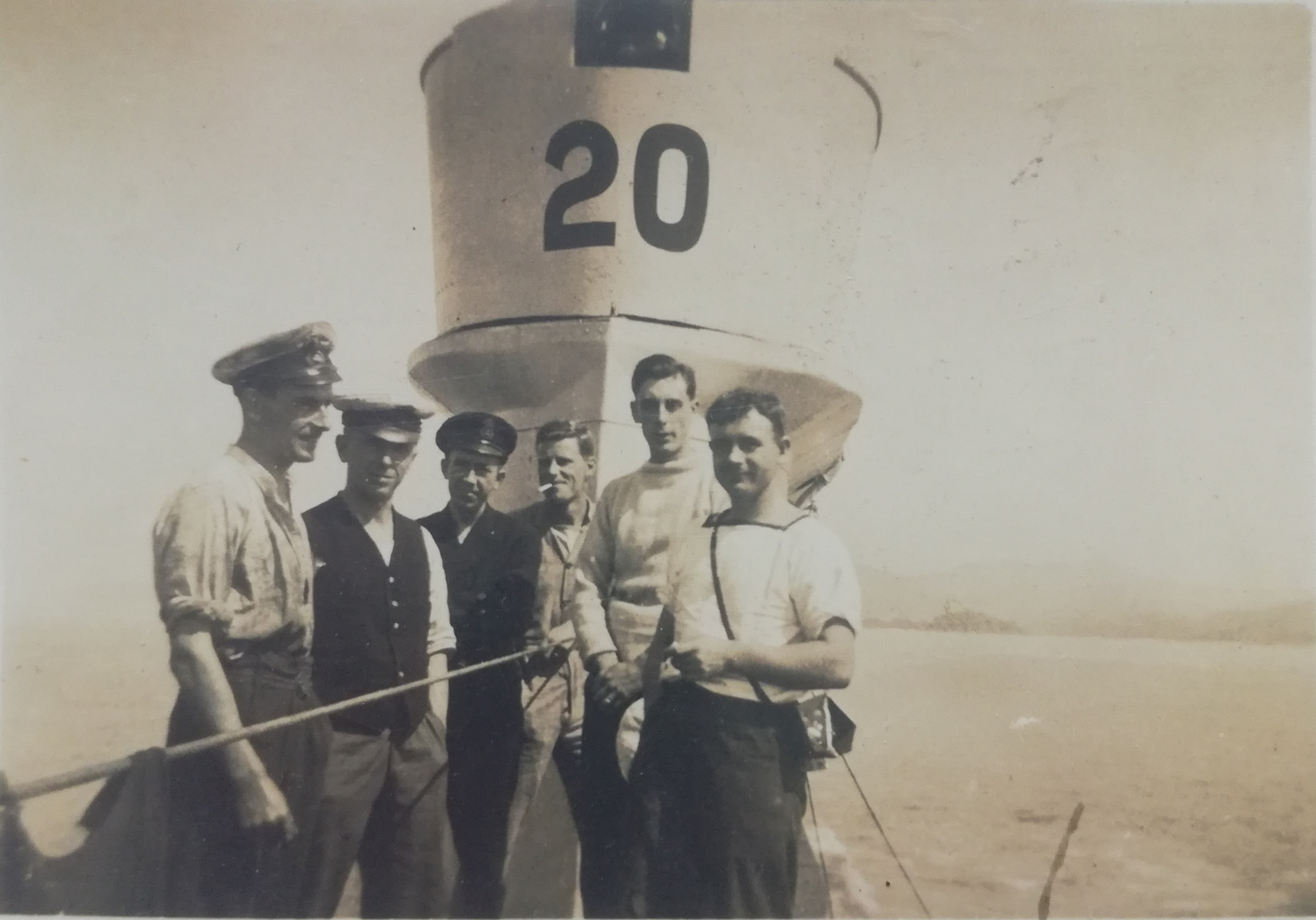
L20 in Bias Bay (Daya Bay), China, May 1929 (Thomas C. Wilding collection)

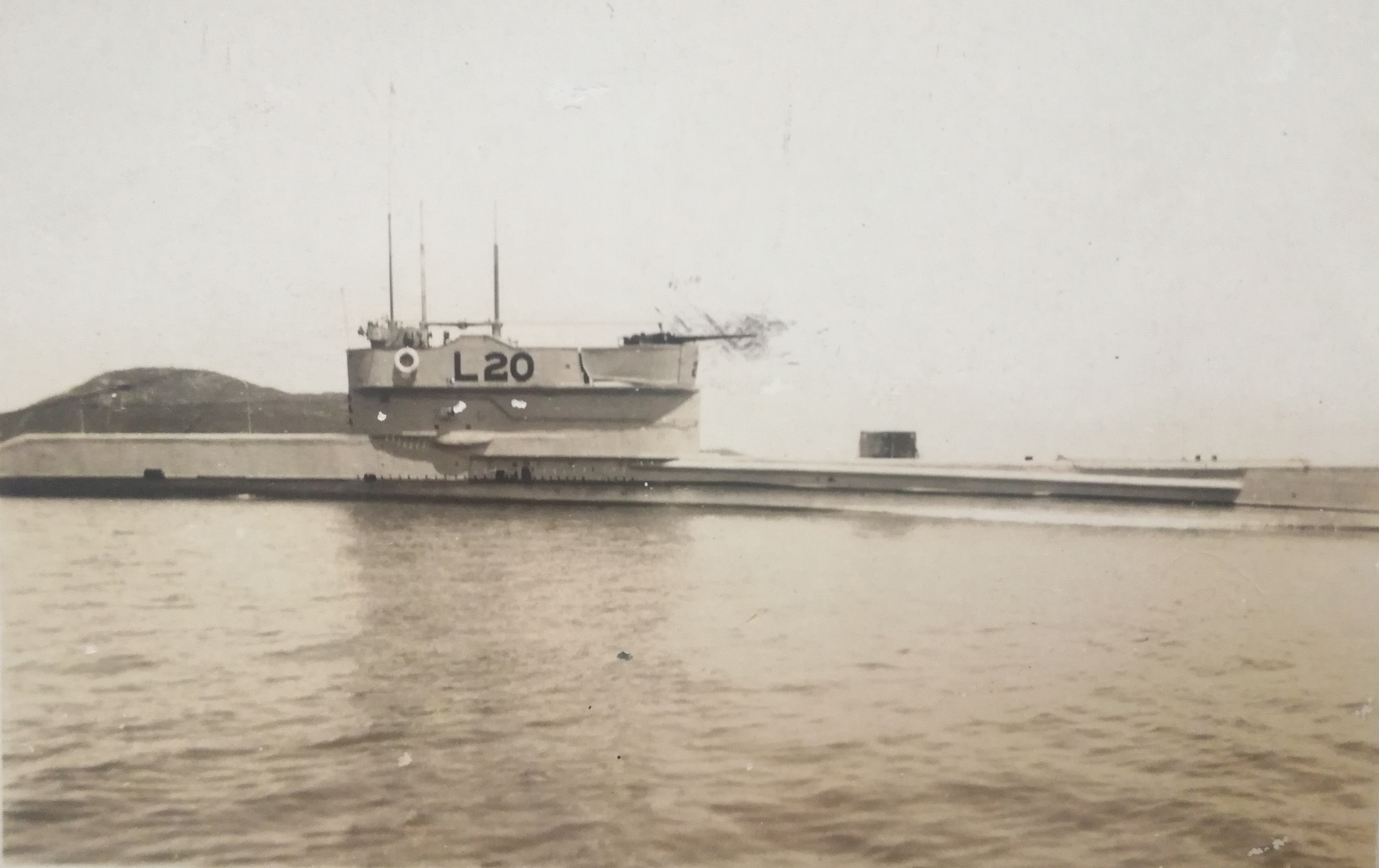
L20 on Yangtze River (written Yangtse Kiang) c. 1929 (Thomas C Wilding collection)
