= HMS L24 =

History

United Kingdom
- Name: HMS L24
- Builder: Vickers Limited, Barrow-in-Furness
- Launched: 19 February 1919
- Fate: Sunk after collision, 10 January 1924

General characteristics
- Class & type: L-class submarine
- Displacement: 914 long tons (929 t) surfaced; 1,089 long tons (1,106 t) submerged
- Length: 238 ft 7 in (72.7 m)
- Beam: 23 ft 6 in (7.2 m)
- Draught: 13 ft 3 in (4.0 m)
- Installed power: 2,400 bhp (1,800 kW) (diesel); 1,600 hp (1,200 kW) (electric)
- Propulsion: 2 × diesel engines; 2 × electric motors
- Speed: 17 kn (31 km/h; 20 mph) surfaced; 10.5 kn (19.4 km/h; 12.1 mph) submerged
- Range: 3,800 nmi (7,000 km; 4,400 mi) at 10 kn (19 km/h; 12 mph) on the surface
- Test depth: 150 feet (45.7 m)
- Complement: 38
- Armament: 4 × bow 21 in (533 mm) torpedo tubes; 2 × beam 18 in (457 mm) torpedo tubes; 1 × 4-inch deck gun

HMS L24 was a L-class submarine built for the Royal Navy during World War I. The boat was not completed before the end of the war and was sunk in an accidental collision in 1924.

== Design and description ==
L9 and its successors were enlarged to accommodate 21-inch (53.3 cm) torpedoes and more fuel. The submarine had a length of 238 feet 7 inches (72.7 m) overall, a beam of 23 feet 6 inches (7.2 m) and a mean draught of 13 feet 3 inches (4.0 m). They displaced 914 long tons (929 t) on the surface and 1,089 long tons (1,106 t) submerged. The L-class submarines had a crew of 38 officers and ratings. They had a diving depth of 150 feet (45.7 m).

For surface running, the boats were powered by two 12-cylinder Vickers 1,200-brake-horsepower (895 kW) diesel engines, each driving one propeller shaft. When submerged each propeller was driven by a 600-horsepower (447 kW) electric motor. They could reach 17 knots (31 km/h; 20 mph) on the surface and 10.5 knots (19.4 km/h; 12.1 mph) underwater. On the surface, the L class had a range of 3,800 nautical miles (7,000 km; 4,400 mi) at 10 knots (19 km/h; 12 mph).

The boats were armed with four 21-inch torpedo tubes in the bow and two 18-inch (45 cm) in broadside mounts. They carried four reload torpedoes for the 21-inch tubes for a grand total of ten torpedoes of all sizes. They were also armed with a 4-inch (102 mm) deck gun.

== Construction and career ==
HMS L24 was built by Vickers at their Barrow-in-Furness shipyard, launched on 19 February 1919, and completed at an unknown date. The boat was sunk with all hands lost in a collision with the battleship Resolution during an exercise off Portland Bill in the English Channel on 10 January 1924. A memorial is located in St Ann's Church in HMNB Portsmouth.

The wreck is located at 50°22.50′N 02°37.79′W at a depth of 52 metres. Her hydroplanes remain set to hard dive, indicating that she was trying to take evasive action. A hatch is open and there is obvious damage where Resolution sliced into her hull. The wreck is designated as a protected place under the Protection of Military Remains Act 1986.
