= HMS L22 =

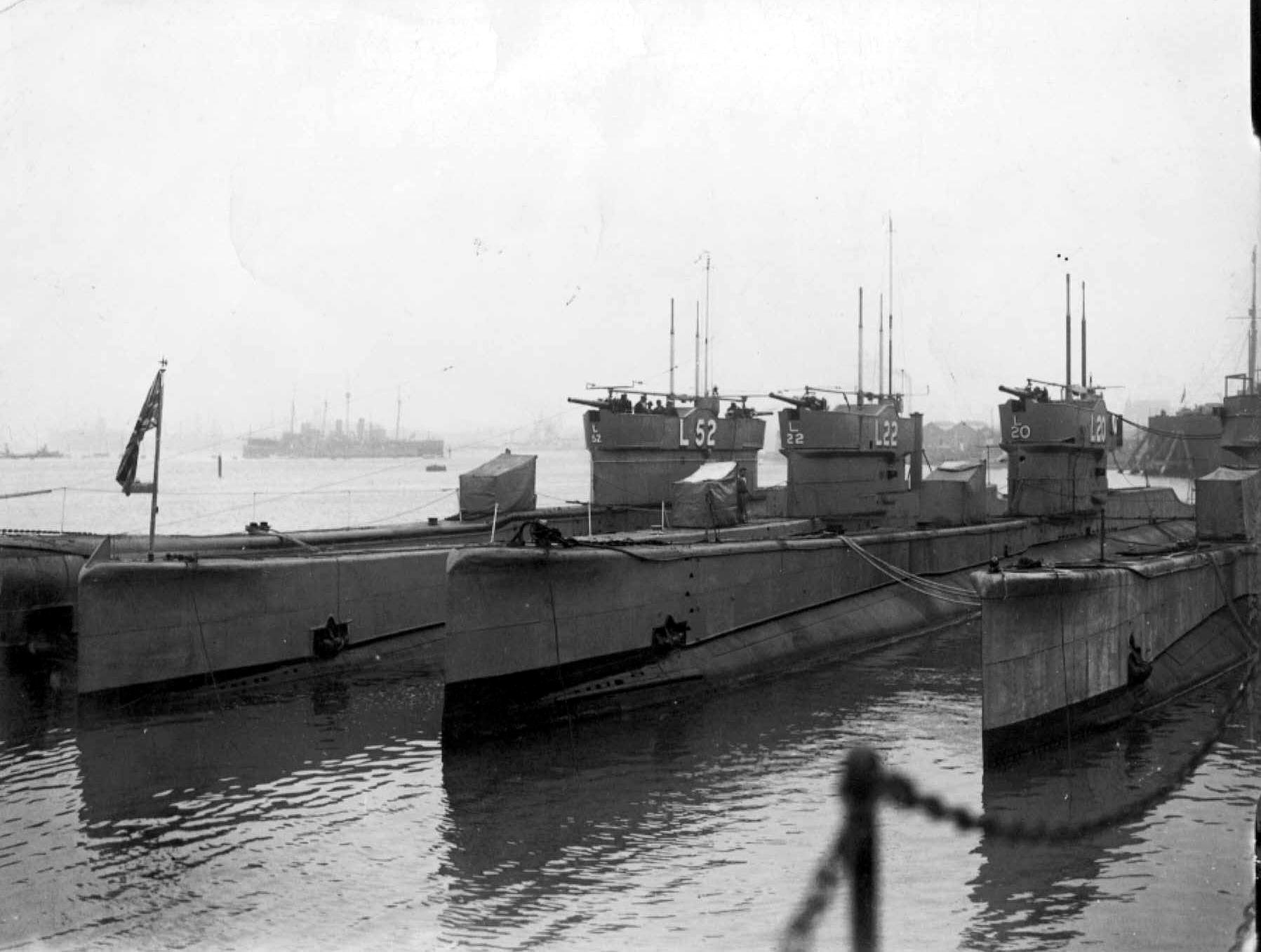
- L22 and three other L–class boats at Gosport (1933)

History

United Kingdom
- Name: HMS L22
- Ordered: December 1916
- Builder: Vickers Limited, Barrow-in-Furness
- Laid down: 28 November 1917
- Launched: 25 October 1919
- Fate: Sold for scrapping, 30 August 1935

General characteristics
- Class & type: L-class submarine
- Displacement: 914 long tons (929 t) surfaced; 1,089 long tons (1,106 t) submerged
- Length: 238 ft 7 in (72.7 m)
- Beam: 23 ft 6 in (7.2 m)
- Draught: 13 ft 3 in (4.0 m)
- Installed power: 2,400 bhp (1,800 kW) (diesel); 1,600 hp (1,200 kW) (electric)
- Propulsion: 2 × diesel engines; 2 × electric motors
- Speed: 17 kn (31 km/h; 20 mph) surfaced; 10.5 kn (19.4 km/h; 12.1 mph) submerged
- Range: 3,800 nmi (7,000 km; 4,400 mi) at 10 kn (19 km/h; 12 mph) on the surface
- Test depth: 150 feet (45.7 m)
- Complement: 38
- Armament: 4 × bow 21 in (533 mm) torpedo tubes; 2 × beam 18 in (457 mm) torpedo tubes; 1 × 4-inch deck gun

HMS L22 was a L-class submarine built for the Royal Navy during World War I. The boat was not completed before the end of the war and was sold for scrap in 1935.

== Design and description ==
L9 and its successors were enlarged to accommodate 21-inch (53.3 cm) torpedoes and more fuel. The submarine had a length of 238 feet 7 inches (72.7 m) overall, a beam of 23 feet 6 inches (7.2 m) and a mean draught of 13 feet 3 inches (4.0 m). They displaced 914 long tons (929 t) on the surface and 1,089 long tons (1,106 t) submerged. The L-class submarines had a crew of 35 officers and ratings. They had a diving depth of 150 feet (45.7 m).

For surface running, the boats were powered by two 12-cylinder Vickers 1,200-brake-horsepower (895 kW) diesel engines, each driving one propeller shaft. When submerged each propeller was driven by a 600-horsepower (447 kW) electric motor. They could reach 17 knots (31 km/h; 20 mph) on the surface and 10.5 knots (19.4 km/h; 12.1 mph) underwater. On the surface, the L class had a range of 3,800 nautical miles (7,000 km; 4,400 mi) at 10 knots (19 km/h; 12 mph).

The boats were armed with four 21-inch torpedo tubes in the bow and two 18-inch (45 cm) in broadside mounts. They carried four reload torpedoes for the 21-inch tubes for a grand total of ten torpedoes of all sizes. They were also armed with a 4-inch (102 mm) deck gun.

== Construction and career ==
HMS L22 was laid down on 28 November 1917 by Vickers at their Barrow-in-Furness shipyard, launched on 25 October 1919, and completed on 10 June 1921. L22 was sold to John Cashmore Ltd on 30 August 1935 for scrapping at Newport.
