= HMS L26 =

1919 L-class Royal Navy submarine

History

United Kingdom
- Name: HMS L26
- Builder: Vickers Limited, Barrow-in-Furness
- Laid down: 31 January 1917
- Launched: 29 May 1919
- Completed: 11 October 1926
- Fate: Sunk as a target, 1 November 1946

General characteristics
- Class & type: L-class submarine
- Displacement: 914 long tons (929 t) surfaced; 1,089 long tons (1,106 t) submerged
- Length: 238 ft 7 in (72.7 m)
- Beam: 23 ft 6 in (7.2 m)
- Draught: 13 ft 3 in (4.0 m)
- Installed power: 2,400 bhp (1,800 kW) (diesel); 1,600 hp (1,200 kW) (electric)
- Propulsion: 2 × diesel engines; 2 × electric motors
- Speed: 17 kn (31 km/h; 20 mph) surfaced; 10.5 kn (19.4 km/h; 12.1 mph) submerged
- Range: 3,800 nmi (7,000 km; 4,400 mi) at 10 kn (19 km/h; 12 mph) on the surface
- Test depth: 150 feet (45.7 m)
- Complement: 38
- Armament: 4 × bow 21 in (533 mm) torpedo tubes; 2 × beam 18 in (457 mm) torpedo tubes; 1 × 4 in (102 mm) deck gun

HMS L26 was a L-class submarine built for the Royal Navy during World War I. The boat was not completed before the end of the war and was one of three L-class boats to serve during World War II. She was sunk as a target in 1946.

== Design and description ==
L9 and its successors were enlarged to accommodate 21-inch (53.3 cm) torpedoes and more fuel. The submarine had a length of 238 feet 7 inches (72.7 m) overall, a beam of 23 feet 6 inches (7.2 m) and a mean draught of 13 feet 3 inches (4.0 m). They displaced 914 long tons (929 t) on the surface and 1,089 long tons (1,106 t) submerged. The L-class submarines had a crew of 35 officers and ratings. They had a diving depth of 150 feet (45.7 m).

For surface running, the boats were powered by two 12-cylinder Vickers 1,200-brake-horsepower (895 kW) diesel engines, each driving one propeller shaft. When submerged each propeller was driven by a 600-horsepower (447 kW) electric motor. They could reach 17 knots (31 km/h; 20 mph) on the surface and 10.5 knots (19.4 km/h; 12.1 mph) underwater. On the surface, the L class had a range of 3,800 nautical miles (7,000 km; 4,400 mi) at 10 knots (19 km/h; 12 mph).

The boats were armed with four 21-inch torpedo tubes in the bow and two 18-inch (45 cm) in broadside mounts. They carried four reload torpedoes for the 21-inch tubes for a grand total of ten torpedoes of all sizes. They were also armed with a 4-inch (102 mm) deck gun.

== Construction and career ==
HMS L26 was built by Vickers at their Barrow-in-Furness shipyard, launched on 29 May 1919. She was transferred to HM Dockyard, Portsmouth and was completed there on 11 October 1926. The boat was damaged in the Mediterranean in March 1929, but was repaired in Gibraltar.

On 7 October 1933, L26 and sister submarine L19 ran aground on manoeuvres off Kintyre but were quickly refloated. The next day, 8 October, L26 suffered an explosion in the battery compartment on board in Campbeltown Harbour, Scotland, which killed two and injured 10 crew. L26's commanding officer, Lieutenant-Commander John Hugh Lewis, was Court-martialled over the incidents, and was found guilty of stranding the submarine and failing to check L26's batteries for damage after the grounding. He was severely reprimanded and dismissed from L26 by the court, although a second hearing cleared him of blame for the explosion and re-instated him to command of L26.

At the onset of World War II, L26 was a member of the 6th Submarine Flotilla. From 26–29 August 1939, the flotilla deployed to its war bases at Dundee and Blyth. From 20 September 1939 to 15 January 1940, the 6th Submarine Flotilla was deployed off Skagerrak, Jutland and Horns Reef. Beginning on 22 March 1941, the Royal Navy and Allies began deploying submarines off Brest, France to prevent the German battleships Gneisenau and Scharnhorst from leaving port. L26 was among the submarines assigned to the patrol.

She was transferred to Canada in 1943 as an anti-submarine training ship. She was based at Digby, Nova Scotia at HMCS Cornwallis and at Bermuda, attached to HMCS Somers Isles. Purchased by the Canadian government in 1946, L26 was sunk as a target for sonar testing off St. Margarets Bay, Nova Scotia on 25 September 1946. The wreck was rediscovered during the search for wreckage from the Swissair Flight 111 crash.
