= British L-class submarine =

Type of British submarines in service during WWI and WWII

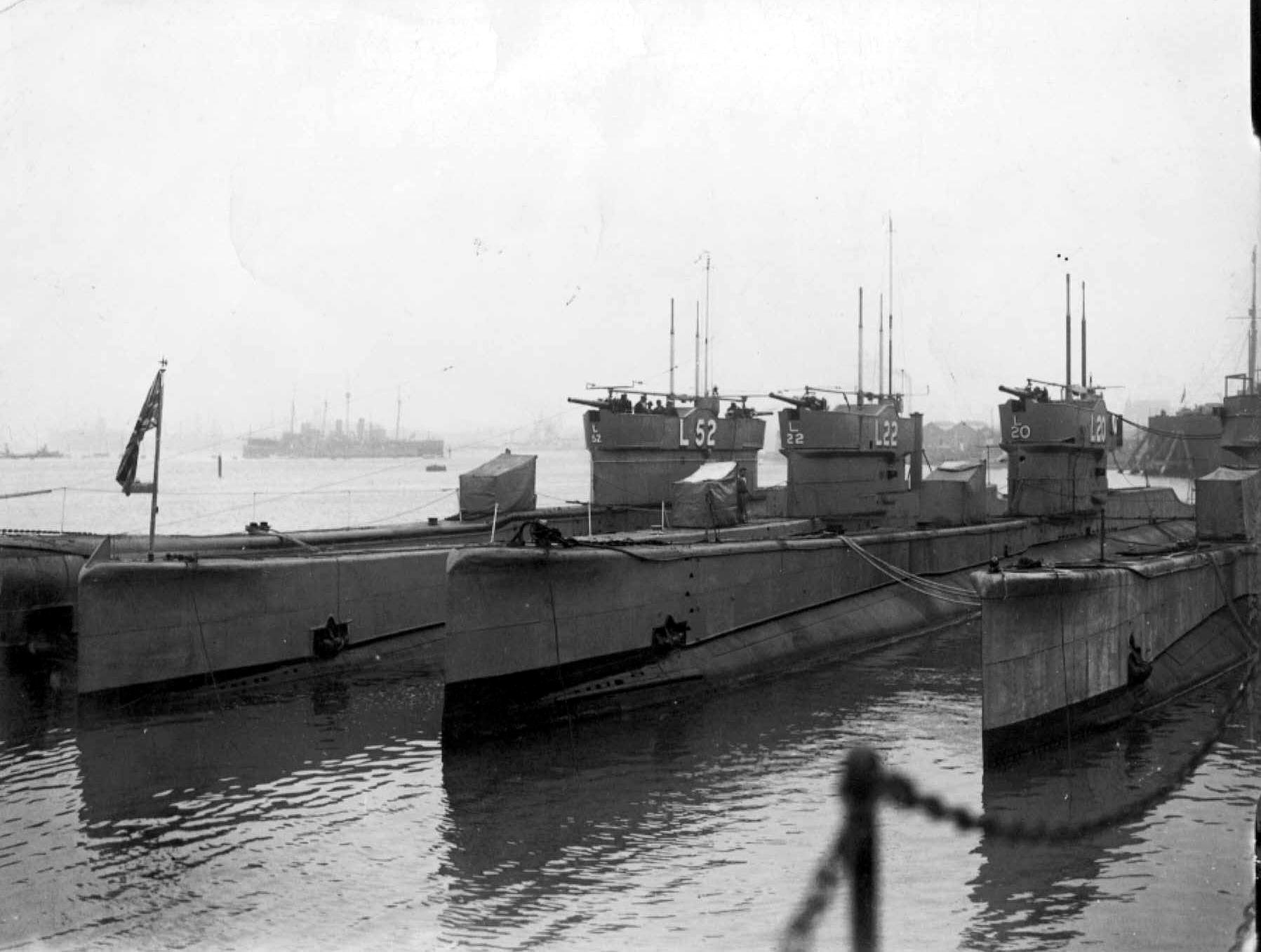
- L52, L22, L20 & L6, at Gosport in 1933

Class overview
- Operators: Royal Navy; Soviet Navy
- Preceded by: E class
- Succeeded by: Odin class
- In commission: 1917 - 1942
- Planned: 73
- Completed: 27

General characteristics
- Type: Submarine
- Displacement: Group 1 : 890 long tons (904 t) surfaced; 1,074 long tons (1,091 t) submerged; Group 2 : 914 long tons (929 t) surfaced; 1,089 long tons (1,106 t) submerged; Group 3 : 960 long tons (975 t) surfaced; 1,150 long tons (1,168 t) submerged
- Length: Group 1 : 222 ft (67.7 m); Group 2 : 228 ft (69.5 m); Group 3 : 230 ft 6 in (70.3 m)
- Beam: 23 ft 6 in (7.16 m)
- Speed: Surfaced; Group 1 : 17.3 knots (32.0 km/h; 19.9 mph); Group 2 : 17 knots (31 km/h; 20 mph); Group 3 : 17.5 knots (32.4 km/h; 20.1 mph); Submerged; 10.5 knots (19.4 km/h; 12.1 mph)
- Range: Group 1 & 2 : 2,800 nmi (5,200 km) at 10 kn (19 km/h; 12 mph) surfaced; Group 3 : 4,800 nmi (8,900 km) at 8 kn (15 km/h; 9.2 mph) surfaced
- Complement: Group 1 : 35; Group 2 : 38; Group 3 : 44
- Armament: Group 1 : 6 × 18-inch (450 mm) torpedo tubes (4 bow, 2 beam); 10 × 18-inch torpedoes; 1 × 4-inch gun; Group 2 : 4 × 21-inch (533 mm) bow torpedo tubes; 2 × 18-inch (450 mm) beam torpedo tubes; 8 × 21-inch and 2 × 18-inch torpedoes; 1 × 4-inch gun; or; 4 × 21-inch (533 mm) torpedo tubes (bow); 16 × mines; 1 × 4-inch gun; Group 3 : 6 × 21-inch (533 mm) torpedo tubes (bow); 12 × 21-inch (533 mm) torpedoes; 2 × 4-inch (102 mm) guns

The British L-class submarine was originally planned under the emergency war programme as an improved version of the British E-class submarine. The scale of change allowed the L class to become a separate class.

The armament was increased when the 21-inch torpedoes came into service. The Group 3 boats had two QF 4-inch guns fore and aft of the lengthened conning tower. Also, 76 tons of fuel oil was carried in external wing tanks for the first time in British submarines. Several of the Group 1 boats were configured as minelayers including L11 and L12. In the Group 2 boats, L14, L17 and L24 to L27 were built as minelayers carrying 16 mines but without the two beam torpedo tubes.

The introduction of the L class came too late to contribute significantly in World War I. L2 was accidentally depth-charged by three American destroyers in early 1918. L12 torpedoed the German submarine UB-90. L10 torpedoed the German destroyer S33 in October 1918 but was sunk by accompanying destroyers. L24 was sunk with all hands lost in a collision with the battleship Resolution during an exercise off Portland Bill in the English Channel on 10 January 1924.

L55 was sunk in 1919 during the British naval intervention in the Russian civil war by Bolshevik Russian destroyers. She was salvaged by the Russians and who re-commissioned her with the same name.

The L class served throughout the 1920s and the majority were scrapped in the 1930s but three remained operational as training boats during World War II. The last three were scrapped in 1946.

Parts of uncompleted L-class submarines were used for the Yugoslav Hrabri-class submarines.

== Design ==
The L class emerged as an improvement on the earlier E class; the first two members of the L class were originally ordered as lengthened E-class boats, and were initially named E57 and E58. The design returned to the circular pressure hull of the E-class boats, as the irregularly shaped hulls of the G and J classes had proved to be unsuccessful, particularly because the circular hull shape was much better at withstanding the force of underwater explosions.

=== Characteristics ===
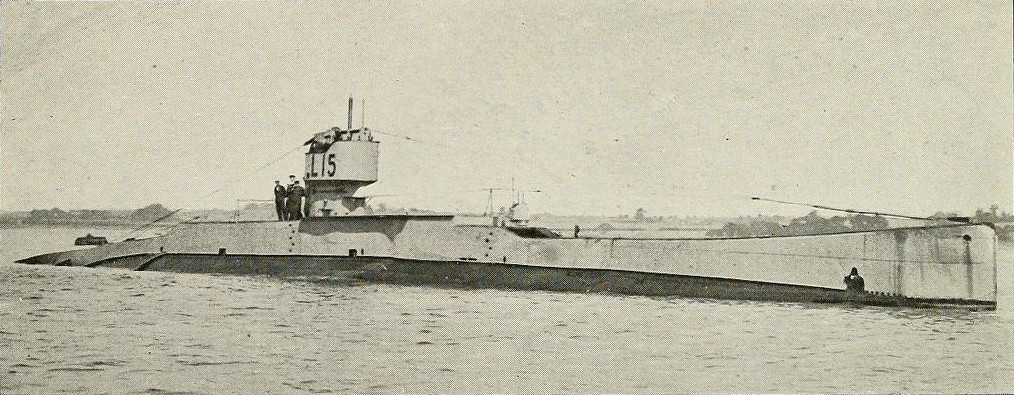
HMS L15, c. 1918

The L-class boats were divided into three separate sub-classes: the I, II, and III types. The I-type boats were 231 feet 1 inch (70.43 m) long overall and they had a beam of 23 ft 5.5 in (7.150 m) and a draught of 13 ft 3 in (4.04 m) at normal loading. They displaced 891 long tons (905 t) surfaced and 1,074 long tons (1,091 t) submerged. The II-type boats were slightly longer, at 238 ft 7 in (72.72 m) overall, with the same beam and draught. They displaced 914 long tons (929 t) surfaced and 1,089 long tons (1,106 t) submerged. The III-type submarines were 235 ft (72 m) long, with the same beam but a draught of 13 ft 1.5 in (4.001 m). They displaced more than their half-sisters, at 960 long tons (975 t) surfaced and 1,150 long tons (1,168 t) submerged. The three sub-classes had crews of 35, 38, and 44, respectively.

All three sub-classes had the same propulsion system: two diesel engines for use while surfaced and two corresponding electric motors for use submerged. The diesel engines were rated at 2,400 horsepower (1,800 kW), while the electric motors produced 1,600 hp (1,200 kW). They could cruise at 17 knots (31 km/h; 20 mph) while surfaced and 10.5 kn (19.4 km/h; 12.1 mph) while submerged. While running on the surface at 10 knots (19 km/h; 12 mph), the submarines could cruise for a range of 3,800 nautical miles (7,000 km; 4,400 mi); range figures for the Type-III boats were instead 4,500 nautical miles (8,300 km; 5,200 mi) at 8 knots (15 km/h; 9.2 mph).

The L-class submarines were armed with a primary armament of six torpedo tubes. The Type-I boats were equipped with six 18-inch (460 mm) tubes, with four in the bow and two on the broadside. These were supplied with a total of ten torpedoes. The Type-II boats exchanged the 18-inch bow tubes for more powerful 21-inch (530 mm) tubes; these had eight torpedoes in total. The 18-inch broadside tubes retained a single torpedo apiece. Those Type-II submarines that were completed as minelaying submarines kept their bow tubes but were not fitted with the broadside tubes. They instead had a capacity for fourteen to sixteen naval mines. The Type-III boats were equipped with six 21-inch tubes, all located in the bow. The first two sub-classes were also equipped with a 4-inch (100 mm) deck gun for use whilst surfaced, while the Type-III submarines had two such guns. The gun was mounted on a revolving platform on the bridge level to increase its range and permit it to engage surfaced enemy submarines beyond torpedo range and in heavier seas.

== Members of the class ==
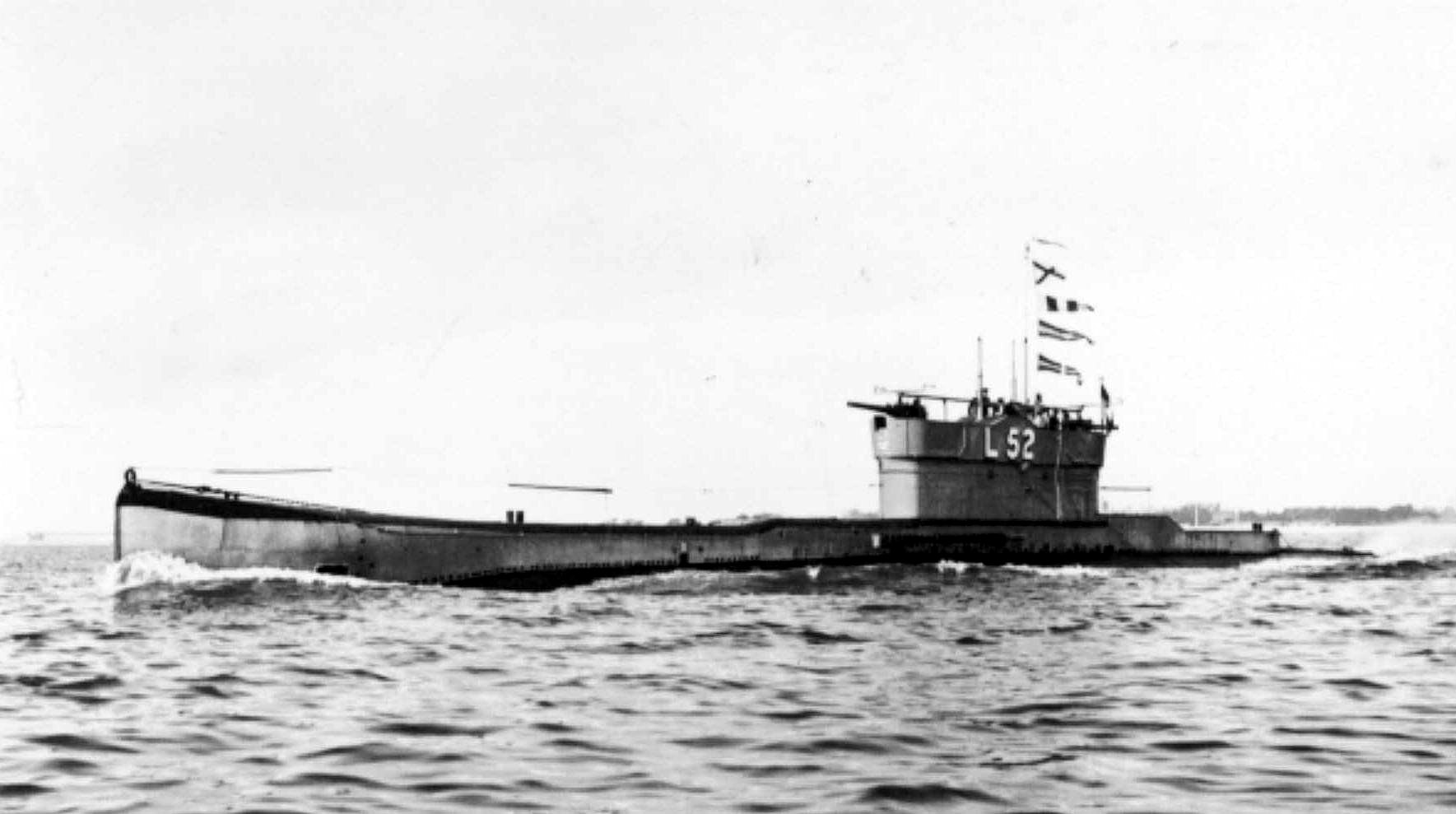
HMS L52 underway

=== Group 1 (L1-class) ===
- HMS L1
- HMS L2
- HMS L3
- HMS L4
- HMS L5
- HMS L6
- HMS L7
- HMS L8

=== Group 2 (L9-class) ===
- HMS L9
- HMS L10
- HMS L11
- HMS L12
- HMS L14
- HMS L15
- HMS L16
- HMS L17
- HMS L18
- HMS L19
- HMS L20
- HMS L21
- HMS L22
- HMS L23
- HMS L24
- HMS L25
- HMS L26
- HMS L27
- L28 to L32 were broken-up after commencement
- HMS L33
- L34 and L35 were cancelled
- L36 to L49 were not ordered
- L50 and L51 were cancelled

=== Group 3 (L50-class) ===
- HMS L52
- HMS L53
- HMS L54
- HMS L55
- HMS L56
- L57 to L68 were cancelled
- HMS L69
- L70 was cancelled
- HMS L71
- L72 to L74 were cancelled
