= HMS L25 =

WWI Submarine

History

United Kingdom
- Name: HMS L25
- Builder: Vickers Limited, Barrow-in-Furness
- Laid down: 25 February 1918
- Launched: 13 February 1919
- Fate: Sold for scrapping, 1935

General characteristics
- Class & type: L-class submarine
- Displacement: 914 long tons (929 t) surfaced; 1,089 long tons (1,106 t) submerged
- Length: 238 ft 7 in (72.7 m)
- Beam: 23 ft 6 in (7.2 m)
- Draught: 13 ft 3 in (4.0 m)
- Installed power: 2,400 bhp (1,800 kW) (diesel); 1,600 hp (1,200 kW) (electric)
- Propulsion: 2 × diesel engines; 2 × electric motors
- Speed: 17 kn (31 km/h; 20 mph) surfaced; 10.5 kn (19.4 km/h; 12.1 mph) submerged
- Range: 3,800 nmi (7,000 km; 4,400 mi) at 10 kn (19 km/h; 12 mph) on the surface
- Test depth: 100 feet (30.5 m)
- Complement: 38
- Armament: 4 × bow 21 in (533 mm) torpedo tubes; 1 × 4-inch deck gun; 14 mines

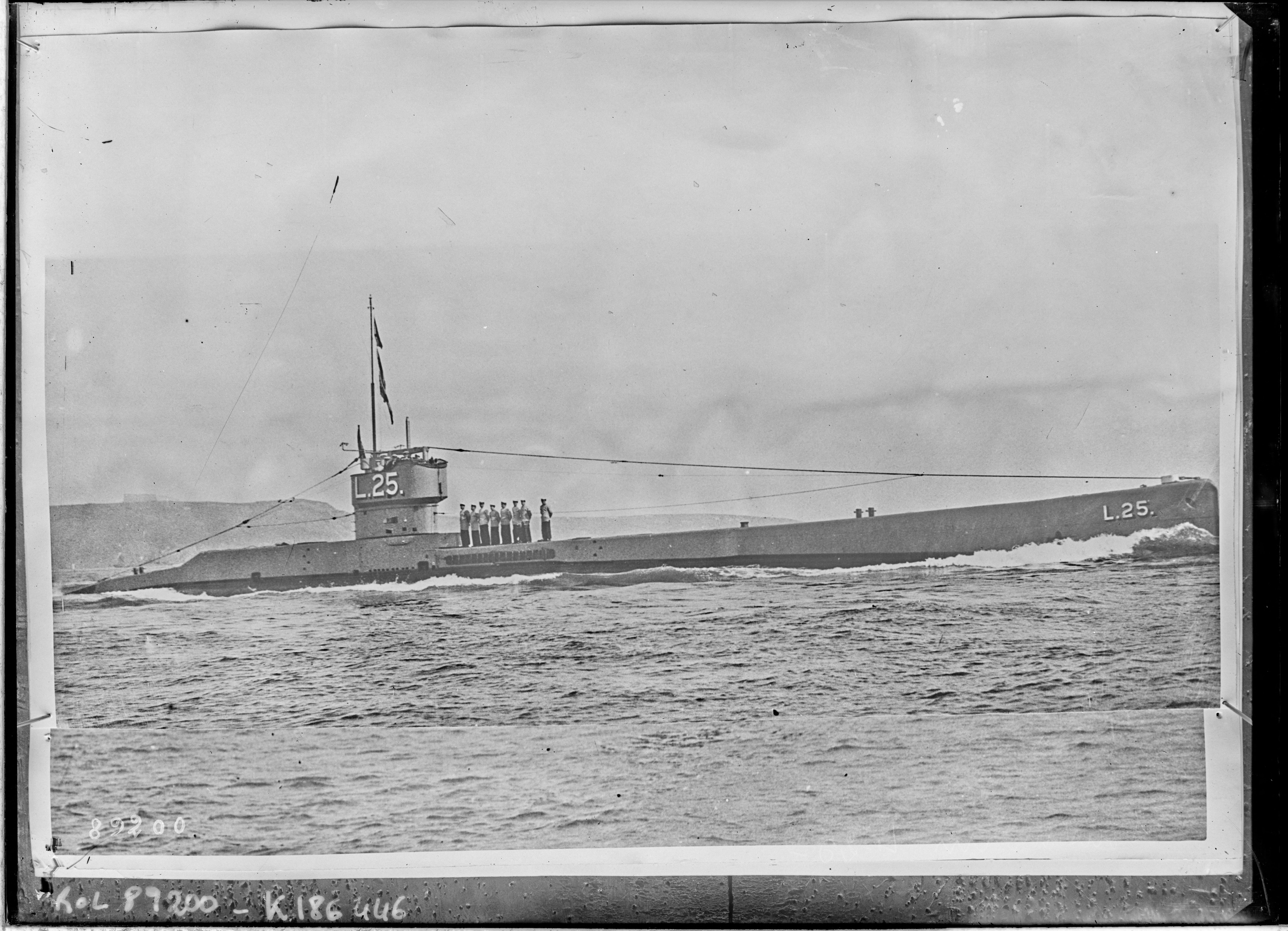
HMS L25 in 1924

HMS L25 was a L-class submarine built for the Royal Navy during World War I. She was one of five boats in the class to be fitted as a minelayer. The boat survived the war and was sold for scrap in 1935.

== Design and description ==
L9 and its successors were enlarged to accommodate 21-inch (53.3 cm) torpedoes and more fuel. The submarine had a length of 238 feet 7 inches (72.7 m) overall, a beam of 23 feet 6 inches (7.2 m) and a mean draught of 13 feet 3 inches (4.0 m). They displaced 914 long tons (929 t) on the surface and 1,089 long tons (1,106 t) submerged. The L-class submarines had a crew of 38 officers and ratings.

For surface running, the boats were powered by two 12-cylinder Vickers 1,200-brake-horsepower (895 kW) diesel engines, each driving one propeller shaft. When submerged each propeller was driven by a 600-horsepower (447 kW) electric motor. They could reach 17 knots (31 km/h; 20 mph) on the surface and 10.5 knots (19.4 km/h; 12.1 mph) underwater. On the surface, the L class had a range of 3,800 nautical miles (7,000 km; 4,400 mi) at 10 knots (19 km/h; 12 mph).

The boats were armed with four 21-inch torpedo tubes in the bow. They carried four reload torpedoes for the 21-inch tubes for a grand total of eight torpedoes. They were also armed with a 4-inch (102 mm) deck gun. L25 was fitted with 14 vertical mine chutes in her saddle tanks and carried one mine per chute.

== Construction and career ==
HMS L25 was built by Vickers, Barrow-in-Furness. She was laid down on 25 February 1918 and was commissioned on 13 February 1919.

L25 ran aground off The Needles, Isle of Wight, on 7 April 1924. She was refloated later that day.

L25 was sold to John Cashmore Ltd for scrapping at Newport, Wales, in 1935. Her ship's bell is in the care of the Royal Navy Submarine Museum.
