= SS Benalbanach (1946) =

History
- Name: Empire Athelstan (1946–47); Benalbanach (1947–66); Camelot (1966–69); Dragon Castle (1969–75)
- Owner: Ministry of Transport (1946–47); Ben Line Steamers (1947–65); Ministry of Transport (1965–69); Board of Trade (1969); Mercur Shipping Enterprise, Panama (1969–75); Cuatebol Shipping SA, Panama (1975)
- Operator: Owner operated except:-; P Henderson & Co (1946); Alfred Holt & Co (1946–47); British India Steam Navigation Co Ltd (1965–68)
- Port of registry: (United Kingdom) Newcastle (1946–47); (United Kingdom) Leith (1947–69); Panama (1969–75)
- Builder: Vickers-Armstrongs, High Walker
- Yard number: 94
- Launched: 15 January 1946
- Completed: June 1946
- Identification: official number 169213 (1946–69); call sign GKJD (1946–47); IMO number: 5040689
- Fate: Scrapped December 1975

General characteristics
- Tonnage: 7,803 GRT; 4,511 NRT; 9,750 DWT
- Length: 451 ft (137.46 m)
- Beam: 66 ft 7 in (20.29 m)
- Depth: 31 ft (9.45 m)
- Propulsion: 2 x steam turbines (Metropolitan Vickers) 800 hp (600 kW), double reduction geared, driving one screw
- Speed: 15 knots (28 km/h)
- Notes: Lifting capacity: 2 x 120 ton derricks

Benalbanach was a 7,803 ton heavy lift cargo ship which was built in 1946 as Empire Athelstan. In 1947 she was sold and renamed Benalbanach. Further name changes were Camelot in 1965 and Dragon Castle in 1969. She was scrapped in 1975.

== History ==
=== Empire Athelstan ===
Empire Athelstan was the first postwar merchant ship built by Vickers-Armstrongs at High Walker. She was yard number 94, launched on 15 January 1946 and completed in June 1946. She was built for the Ministry of Transport and initially managed by P Hendersonn & Co, and then by Alfred Holt & Co. In April 1947, Empire Athelstan was put up for sale by tender, at a minimum purchase price of £340,000, with delivery after 31 May and before 31 August 1947.

Empire Athelstan was powered by two Metropolitan-Vickers steam turbines, double reduction geared to one screw. She could achieve 15 knots (28 km/h). She had two derricks with a lifting capacity of 120 tons.

=== Benalbanach ===
In 1947, Empire Athelstan was sold to E G Thompson (Shipping) Ltd, Leith, who traded as Ben Line Steamers Ltd. She was renamed Benalbanach, the second of five Ben Line ships to bear that name. In 1949, Benalbanach transported military supplies to Malaya and Hong Kong, the latter as defence against incursions from mainland China then involved in a Civil War. She served with Ben Line until 1963 when she was laid up at Hartlepool. In 1965 she was sold to the Ministry of Transport and renamed Camelot.

=== Camelot ===
Camelot was placed under the management of the British India Steam Navigation Co Ltd. In February 1968 she was laid up in the River Fal. In 1969, ownership of Camelot passed to the Sea Transport Branch of the Board of Trade. Later that year, she was sold to Mercur Shipping Enterprise, Panama and renamed Dragon Castle.

=== Dragon Castle ===
Dragon Castle was operated by Mercur for six years. In 1975, she was sold to Cuatebol Shipping S.A., Panama, operating under the management of Societa Italia Gestioni, Italy. Later that year, she was sold to Brodospas for scrap, arriving at Split, Yugoslavia on 5 December 1975.

== Trivia ==
As "Benalbanach" this ship is seen for few seconds in the German criminal series "Stahlnetz 04 - Die Tote im Hafenbecken" ("the dead in the harbor basin") of 1959, anchoring in Hamburg harbour, at the moment when the victim is found by harbour employers.

As "Dragon Castle", the ship can be seen briefly near the end of the motion picture "Mean Frank and Crazy Tony" (1973).

== Official number and call sign ==
As Empire Athelstan, Benalbanach and Camelot, the ship had the UK official number 169213. Empire Athelstan used the call sign GKJD. Benalbanach, Camelot and Dragon Castle had the IMO Number 5040869.
