= List of ships of World War II (O) =

The List of ships of the Second World War contains major military vessels of the war, arranged alphabetically and by type. The list includes armed vessels that served during the war and in the immediate aftermath, inclusive of localized ongoing combat operations, garrison surrenders, post-surrender occupation, colony re-occupation, troop and prisoner repatriation, to the end of 1945. For smaller vessels, see also list of World War II ships of less than 1000 tons. Some uncompleted Axis ships are included, out of historic interest. Ships are designated to the country under which they operated for the longest period of the Second World War, regardless of where they were built or previous service history. Submarines show submerged displacement.

Click on headers to sort column alphabetically.

List of ships of World War II (O)
Ship	Country or organization	Class	Type	Displacement (tons)	First commissioned	Fate
O'Brien	United States Navy	Sims	destroyer	1,570	2 March 1940	sunk 19 October 1942
Oak Hill	United States Navy	Ashland	Dock landing ship	7,930	29 January 1944	Transferred to Taiwan, November 1960
Oakland	United States Navy	Atlanta	light cruiser	6,000	17 July 1943	decommissioned 1949, scrapped 1959
Oakley	Royal Navy	Hunt	destroyer	1,050	7 May 1942	
Oakville	Royal Canadian Navy	Flower	corvette	925	18 November 1941	paid off 20 July 1945
Obdurate	Royal Navy	O	minelayer destroyer	1,540	3 September 1942	paid off 1948, scrapped 1965
Obedient	Royal Navy	O	minelayer destroyer	1,540	30 October 1942	paid off 1957, scrapped 1962
Oberon	Royal Navy	Odin	submarine	1,922	24 August 1927	paid off 5 July 1944
Ocean	Royal Navy	Colossus	aircraft carrier	13,200	8 August 1945	scrapped May 1962
Océan	French Navy	Courbet	accommodation ship	23,475	5 June 1913	captured Germany 27 November 1942, sunk 1944, scrapped 14 December 1945
Oceanway	Royal Navy	Casa Grande	Dock landing ship	7,930	29 March 1944	Transferred to Greece March 1947
Odin	Royal Navy	Odin	submarine	2,038	21 December 1929	Sunk 14 June 1940
Offa	Royal Navy	O	destroyer	1,540	20 September 1941	scrapped 1959
Ōi	Imperial Japanese Navy	Kuma	light cruiser	5,100	10 October 1921	sunk by USS Flasher 19 July 1944
Okinoshima	Imperial Japanese Navy		minelayer	4,290	30 September 1936	sunk 12 May 1942
Oklahoma	United States Navy	Nevada	battleship	29,000	2 May 1916	sunk 7 December 1941; raised and sunk under tow 1947
Oklahoma City	United States Navy	Cleveland	light cruiser	11,800	22 December 1944	converted to missile cruiser 1960, sunk as target 1999
Oktyabrskaya Revolutsiya	Soviet Navy	Gangut	battleship	23,000	3 June 1909	scrapped 1959
Oldenburg	Kriegsmarine		minelayer	1,141	13 September 1943	former water tanker Garigiliano captured from Italy
Olympus	Royal Navy	Odin	submarine	2,038	14 June 1930	sunk 8 May 1942
Omaha	United States Navy	Omaha	light cruiser	7,050	24 February 1923	Scrapped February 1946
Ommaney Bay	United States Navy	Casablanca	escort carrier	7,800	11 February 1944	scuttled 4 January 1945
Onslaught	Royal Navy	O	destroyer	1,540	19 June 1942	scrapped 1977
Onslow	Royal Navy	O	destroyer	1,540	8 October 1941	paid off April 1947
Ontario	Royal Canadian Navy	Minotaur	light cruiser	8,800	July 1944	laid up 15 October 1958
Opportune	Royal Navy	O	minelayer destroyer	1,540	14 August 1942	paid off 1954, scrapped 1955
Orchis	Royal Navy	Flower	corvette	925	29 November 1940	21 August 1944
Ordronaux	United States Navy	Benson	destroyer	1,620	13 February 1943	decommissioned 1947, scrapped 1973
Orillia	Royal Canadian Navy	Flower	corvette	925	25 November 1940	paid off 2 July 1945
Orella	Chile	Serrano	destroyer	1,090		
Oribi	Royal Navy	O	destroyer	1,540	5 July 1941	paid off 1 January 1946
Orion	Royal Navy	Leander	light cruiser	7,000	18 January 1934	scrapped 1949
Orion	Kriegsmarine		auxiliary cruiser	15,700	9 December 1939	sunk 4 May 1945
Orkney	Royal Canadian Navy	River	frigate	1,445	18 April 1944	paid off 22 January 1946
Orpheus	Royal Navy	Odin	submarine	2,038	23 September 1930	Sunk 19 June 1940
Orwell	Royal Navy	O	minelayer destroyer	1,540	17 October 1942	
Orzeł	Poland	Orzeł	submarine	1,100	2 February 1939	sunk 11 June 1940
Oscar II	Swedish Navy	Oscar II	coastal defence ship			paid off 1950, scrapped 1974
Osiris	Royal Navy	Odin	submarine	2,038	25 January 1929	paid off 7 March 1945
Oswald	Royal Navy	Odin	submarine	2,038	1 May 1929	Sunk 1 August 1940
Ottawa	Royal Canadian Navy	C	destroyer	1,375	15 June 1938	sunk 14 September 1942 by U-91
Otus	Royal Navy	Odin	submarine	2,038	5 July 1929	paid off March 1946
Otway	Royal Navy	Odin	submarine	1,922	15 June 1927	paid off 1945
Ouragan	French Navy; Free French Naval Forces; Poland	Bourrasque	destroyer	1,319	19 January 1927	to Poland 17 July 1940, to Free French 30 April 1941, scrapped 7 April 1949
Outremont	Royal Canadian Navy	River	frigate	1,445	27 November 1943	paid off 7 June 1965
Owen Sound	Royal Canadian Navy	Flower modified	corvette	1,015	17 November 1943	19 July 1945
Oxley	Royal Navy	Odin	submarine	1,922	1 April 1927	sunk by friendly fire 10 September 1939
Oxlip	Royal Navy	Flower	corvette	925	28 December 1941	
Ōyodo	Imperial Japanese Navy	Ōyodo	light cruiser	11,433	28 February 1943	sunk 25 July 1945
