= HMS Medway (1928) =

Submarine depot ship constructed for the Royal Navy

Coordinates: 32°03′N 30°55′E

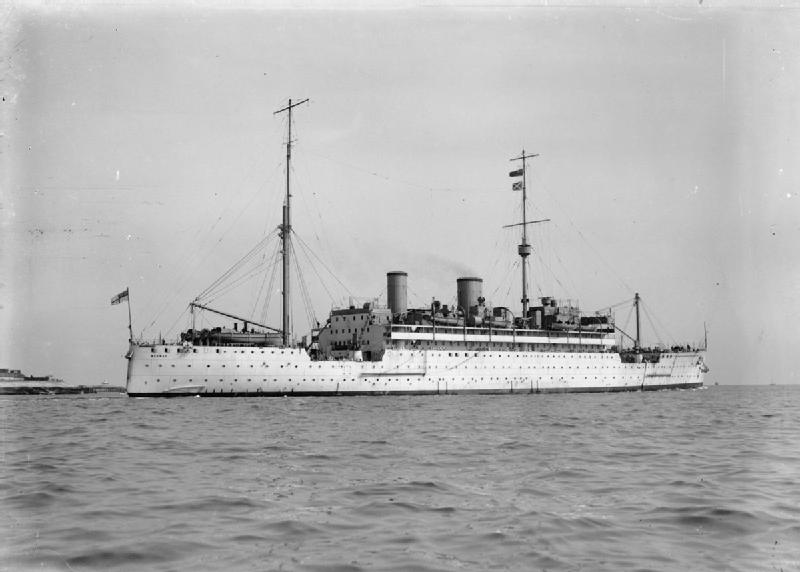
- Medway at anchor

History

United Kingdom
- Name: HMS Medway
- Namesake: River Medway
- Ordered: 14 September 1926
- Builder: Vickers-Armstrongs, Barrow-in-Furness
- Laid down: April 1927
- Launched: 19 July 1928
- Completed: 3 July 1929
- Identification: Pennant number: 25
- Fate: Sunk, 30 June 1942

General characteristics
- Type: Submarine depot ship
- Displacement: 14,650 long tons (14,890 t) standard; 18,362 long tons (18,657 t) (full load)
- Length: 580 ft (176.8 m) (o/a)
- Beam: 85 ft (25.9 m)
- Draught: 21 ft 3 in (6.5 m)
- Installed power: 8,000 bhp (6,000 kW)
- Propulsion: 2 shafts, MAN diesel engines
- Speed: 15 knots (28 km/h; 17 mph)
- Complement: 400 + 1,335 (spare)
- Armament: 4 × 1 – QF 4-inch anti-aircraft guns; 2 × 1 – 4-inch (102 mm) guns
- Armour: Deck: 1.5 in (38 mm); Bulkheads: 1.5 in (38 mm)

HMS Medway (Pennant F25) was the first purpose-built submarine depot ship constructed for the Royal Navy. She was built by Vickers-Armstrongs at Barrow-in-Furness during the late 1920s. The ship served on the China Station before the Second World War and was transferred to Egypt in early 1940. Ordered to evacuate Alexandria in the face of the German advance after the Battle of Gazala in May 1942, Medway sailed for Lebanon at the end of June, escorted by a light cruiser and seven destroyers. Her strong escort could not protect her; on 30 June a German submarine torpedoed and sank her.

== Description and construction ==
Medway was designed to support up to 18 Odin and Parthian-class submarines in peacetime and an additional three submarines during wartime. She carried three QF 4-inch Mk IV deck guns as spares together with 144 21-inch (533 mm) torpedoes to resupply her submarines. The ship proved to be less top-heavy than anticipated and had the enormously high metacentric height of 13 feet (4.0 m) at full load. Built with bilge keels only 12 inches (305 mm) deep, Medway once rolled 42° each way with a period of nine seconds, losing her main topmast. Her bilge keels were subsequently increased in depth to 36 inches (914 mm).

She was 580 feet (176.8 m) long overall and had a beam of 85 feet 1 inch (25.9 m) and a draught of 21 feet 3 inches (6.5 m). The ship displaced 14,650 long tons (14,890 t) at standard load and up to 18,362 long tons (18,657 t) at (full load). Her crew numbered 400 officers and ratings; she could also accommodate up to 1,335 additional men.

The ship was powered by MAN diesel engines rated at 8,000 brake horsepower (6,000 kW), driving two shafts, and had a top speed of about 15 knots (28 km/h; 17 mph). Medway carried 810 long tons (820 t) of diesel fuel for herself and an additional 1,880 long tons (1,910 t) for her submarines. Figures for her range are not available. The ship had five 560-kilowatt (750 hp) diesel generators for electrical power and special provisions to recharge submarine batteries.

She was armed with two low-angle 4-inch (102 mm) guns in single mounts and four quick-firing Mk V 4-inch anti-aircraft guns, also in single mounts. The latter guns were controlled by a High-Angle Control System mounted above the bridge. Medway was protected by an internal anti-torpedo bulge which incorporated a water jacket of 1,374 long tons (1,396 t). Amidships a 1.5-inch (38 mm) torpedo bulkhead was located 13 feet inboard that inclined outwards above the waterline. The main deck was 1.5 inches thick amidships.

Medway was ordered on 14 September 1926 as part of the 1925/26 Naval Estimates. The ship was laid down in April 1927 by the Vickers-Armstrongs shipyard in Barrow-in-Furness. The ship was launched on 19 July 1928. Captain Colin Cantlie was appointed as the first commander of the new ship on 1 January 1929. The ship was completed on 3 July 1929.

After completion, HMS Medway began Harbour Acceptance Trials and Sea Acceptance Trials, known in the Royal Navy as HATs and SATs. A report in The Singapore Free Press and Mercantile Advertiser on 27 July 1929 notes that Medway was undergoing trials.

== Career ==
Medway served on the China Station before the start of the Second World War. She had taken over from HMS Titania in 1929/30 as the submarine depot ship for the 4th Submarine Flotilla. HMS Medway took her place in Hong Kong as the depot ship for the 4th Submarine Flotilla. Under the command of Capt. Colin Cantlie HMS Medway sailed to Hong Kong with six O-class submarines of the Odin group. They were; HMS Odin, HMS Olympus, HMS Osiris, HMS Orpheus, HMS Oswald, and HMS Otus. The submarine flotilla was enlarged in 1930.

Medway was under refit at Singapore from September 1939 through February 1940. Upon completion of the refit, Medway sailed for Hong Kong where she remained until she departed for Alexandria on 2 April. She arrived there on 3 May and thereafter supported the 1st Submarine Flotilla, which operated in the Eastern Mediterranean.

Two years later, Vice-Admiral Henry Harwood, Commander-in-Chief, Mediterranean Fleet, ordered all non-essential ships to leave Alexandria in June 1942 as he was preparing to demolish the port facilities there to prevent their capture by the advancing Panzer Army Africa. Medway loaded stores and 1,135 personnel on 29 June to establish a new base at Beirut, Lebanon and sailed later that day for Beirut. Accompanied by the Greek ship SS Corinthia, Medway was escorted by the light cruiser Dido and the destroyers Sikh, Zulu, Hero, Exmoor, Aldenham, Croome, and Tetcott. The next day, off Port Said, the German submarine U-372 fired two torpedoes that sank Medway; 30 men were lost in the sinking. 47 of the 90 spare torpedoes aboard floated free of the wreck and were salvaged.

== See also ==
- Submarine tender
- HMS Ambrose (1914)
- HMS Hazard (1894)
- HMS Cyclops (F31)
