= Michael Lindsay Coulton Crawford =

Royal Navy officer (1917-2017)

Michael Lindsay Coulton Crawford DSC & Bar
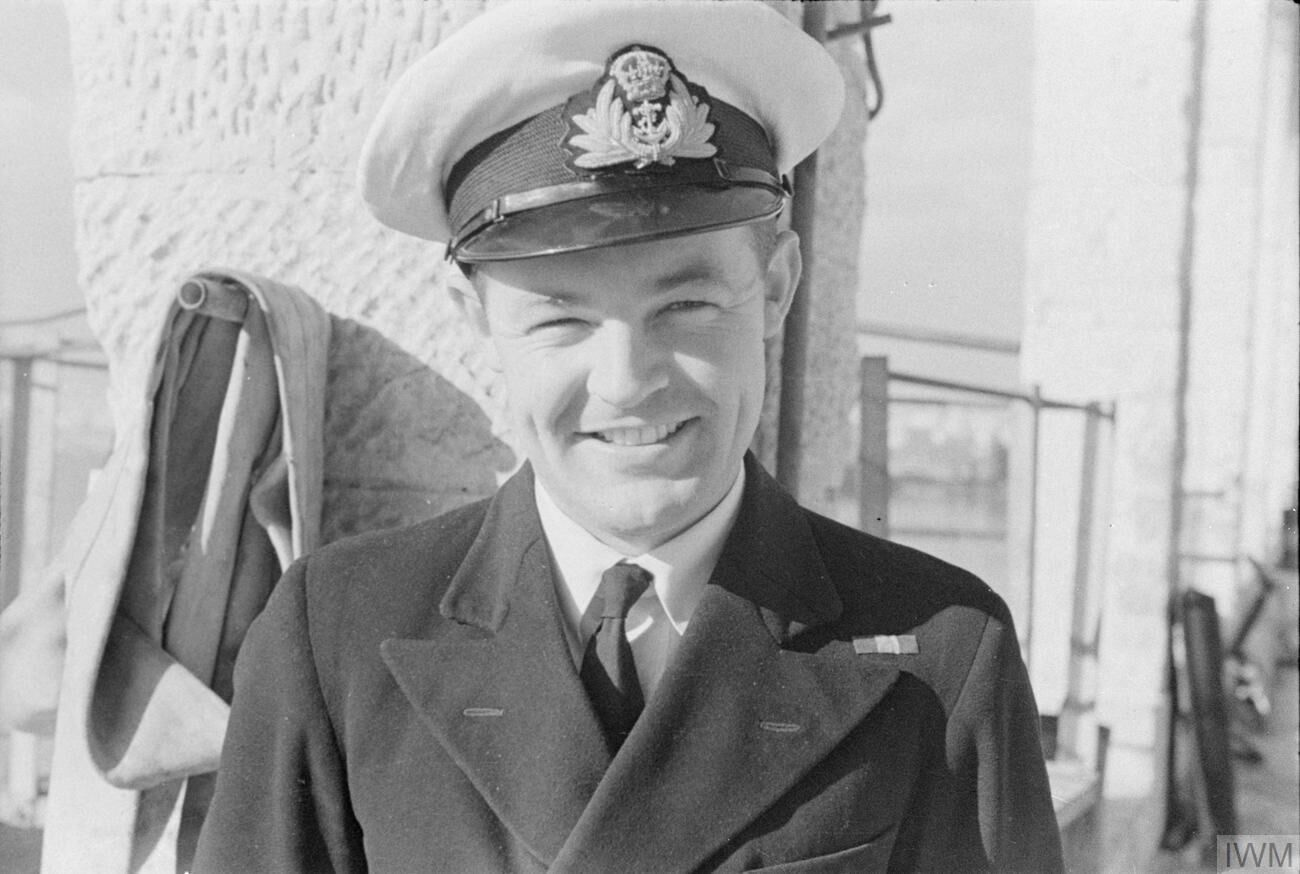
- Lieutenant Crawford, commanding officer of P51 (HMS Unseen), c. late 1942 – early 1943, Malta
- Born: 27 June 1917; Near Cuckfield, Sussex, England
- Died: 28 June 2017 (aged 100); UK
- Spouse: Margaret Hendy Lewis
- Military career
- Allegiance: United Kingdom
- Branch: Royal Navy
- Service years: 1931–68
- Rank: Captain
- Unit: Royal Navy Submarine Service
- Commands: HMS H50; HMS Unseen (P51); HMS Oberon (P21); HMS Tireless (P327)
- Conflicts: Second World War: Mediterranean; Operation Excess; Siege of Malta; Operation Husky
- Awards: Distinguished Service Cross & Bar

Captain Michael Lindsay Coulton "Tubby" Crawford DSC & Bar (27 June 1917 – 28 June 2017) was an officer in the Royal Navy and submariner.

== Early life and family ==
Michael Lindsay Coulton Crawford was born near Cuckfield, Sussex, England, to Walter Coulton Crawford and his wife. Tubby and his brother Peter spent their early years in Kenya where their father, who had served in the Royal Engineers in the First World War, had been granted some farmland and also served as an engineer with the Kenya and Uganda Railway. In 1924 Crawford, aged 6, and his brother were sent to England where they attended Merton Court preparatory school in Sidcup. Their father died on 10 November 1926 while they were in England. The boys' mother returned to England thereafter, to live on the Isle of Wight in "straitened circumstances".

== Royal Navy ==
Crawford matriculated into Royal Naval College, Dartmouth, in January 1931. Crawford served as a cadet and midshipman in the York-class cruiser HMS Exeter. He passed out from Dartmouth as a midshipman on 1 May 1935. He also served aboard HMS Malaya and HMS Revenge in the Home Fleet before attending his Sub-Lieutenant's course.

Crawford was promoted sub-lieutenant on 16 May 1938, lieutenant on 16 September 1939, acting lieutenant-commander on 1 November 1944, lieutenant commander on 16 March 1947, commander on 30 June 1951, and finally captain on 30 June 1959.

=== Submarine service ===
Crawford decided to join the submarine service (colloquially known within the Royal Navy as "the Trade") after his time as a midshipman in large ships made him believe that being in a small vessel, such as a submarine, would provide more responsibility for a junior officer. During his wartime career, he would serve as first lieutenant to the two most successful British submarine aces: Benjamin Bryant (by most ships sunk) and Malcolm Wanklyn (by tonnage sunk).

==== Second World War ====
From August to October 1938, he served on the submarine depot ship HMS Maidstone in the Mediterranean.

===== HMS Sealion (72S) =====
From 5 January 1939, Sub-Lieut. Crawford served aboard HMS Sealion, under the command of Lieut. Cmdr. Benjamin Bryant, as part of the submarine squadron stationed in Malta, on Manoel Island. The squadron's tasks during September 1939 consisted largely of exercising, included training Royal Navy surface ships in anti-submarine warfare.

Sealion left Malta on 11 October 1939, with Crawford by this time promoted lieutenant, to return to the UK. Sealion left Portsmouth on her first war patrol on 28 October 1939, ordered to patrol in the North Sea (Dogger Bank) area. On 6 November 1939, she fired six torpedoes at U-21 off the Dogger Bank but all missed. The enemy submarine surfaced and an attempt was made to engage her with the deck gun, but this proved impossible due to the heavy seas.

Sealion conducted a number of patrols in late 1939 and early 1940, operating from Harwich, in the North Sea and off the Dutch coast. Her first success came in the sinking of the German merchant ship August Leonhardt on 11 April 1940 off the Danish island of Anholt in the Skaggerak. In subsequent patrols, Sealion made a number of unsuccessful attacks: on 6 May 1940 on the German transports Moltkefels and Neidenfels with six torpedoes; on 3 July 1940 on a convoy off the Boknafjord, Norway; and on 8 July 1940 on the beached wreck of the German merchant ship Palime off Obrestadt, which had struck a mine on 5 June 1940. Crawford related that on one occasion Sealion was sent into the Skagerrak with the purpose of making her presence known so that the Germans would concentrate their anti-submarine efforts there (possibly this was in April or June 1940). Sealion's patrols took her as far north as Stavanger, when she was, according to Crawford, not far from where her sister boat HMS Shark was destroyed. On one occasion during this period, Crawford recalls that Sealion was forced to remain submerged for 45 hours at a stretch without ventilation.

On 29 July 1940, Sealion attacked the German submarine U-62, first with torpedoes and then with her deck gun. Due to the wrong range having been entered by the sight-setter, the shells fell far short and U-62 dived and escaped. She finished that patrol by sinking the Norwegian merchant Toran on 4 August and then attacking but failing to sink the German merchant Cläre Hugo Stinnes on 6 August. During the latter attack, Bryant failed to observe a tug (UJ 123) which was escorting the convoy, which then rammed the Sealion, causing heavy damage to her periscopes. She crept back to Rosyth and was then sent down to the Swan & Hunter yard in Newcastle for a refit. Upon arrival at Swan & Hunter on 13 August, Crawford was relieved and sent to Dundee to join HMS L23 as first lieutenant, which sailed to Scapa Flow for anti-submarine exercises.

===== HMS Upholder (N99) =====
After three months with L23, Lieut. Crawford was appointed first lieutenant in HMS Upholder, under the command of Lieut. Cmdr. Malcolm Wanklyn (later VC). Crawford joined the boat on 10 December 1940; she sailed for Gibraltar on 12 December and thence to Malta to join the 10th Submarine Flotilla. On the way, Upholder participated in Operation Excess, acting as a screen for ships sailing to Malta, including HMS Illustrious, the Royal Navy's new aircraft carrier. Upon arrival in Malta, Upholder was berthed adjacent to Illustrious, which suffered repeated Luftwaffe attacks.

From her base in Malta, Upholder engaged in normal patrolling duties with the purpose of preventing supplies reaching Axis forces in North Africa, with a particular focus on shipping sailing down the west coast of Sicily down the Tunisian coast to Tripoli and down the eastern side of Sicily from Taranto. Her early patrols were not particularly successful. Crawford suggests that one reason may be that at that time there were restrictions on the number of torpedoes which should be launched during attacks, which meant that in some attacks only two were fired at a target rather than three. On one occasion, on 12 April 1941, Upholder was out of torpedoes, but still achieved a minor success by persuading an enemy convoy to turn round by firing star-shell.

On 26 April 1941, Upholder attacked the wreck of the German merchant ship Arta, which had run aground on the sand-banks off Kerkennah in Tunisia. A party was sent aboard and documents were retrieved from the captain's safe, which was blown open using explosives. The party then destroyed the wreck with demolition charges. On the following day, Upholder attempted to get close to the similarly grounded wreck of the Italian destroyer Lampo, but ran aground herself before she could reach her. Several days later, on 1 May, Upholder attacked a merchant convoy, sinking the German merchant ship Arcturus and damaging and later sinking the German merchant ship Leverkusen.

Crawford later recalled that on one occasion Upholder was selected to land a party of commandos at Taormina in an attempt to assassinate Luftwaffe Generalfeldmarschall Albert Kesselring, who intelligence indicated was staying at the Miramar Hotel. Wanklyn volunteered Upholder for the job, partly because he had spent his honeymoon in Taormina and was familiar with the bay. Upholder was fitted out for the task with a fender in order to avoid damaging her bow on the rocks. The operation was postponed and later cancelled due to Kesselring reportedly having left Taormina. Various sources, including Crawford, suggest that this episode occurred in April 1941.

In May, off the east coast of Sicily, Upholder took part in perhaps her most famous engagement. She was patrolling at dusk. Crawford was on watch and saw a dark shape and called Wanklyn to the periscope, who took over and carried out a daring attack for which he was later awarded the Victoria Cross. Upholder had already taken part in two attacks and so had only two torpedoes remaining. Also, her ASDIC was out of action. Upholder fired her two torpedoes and sank the Italian schooner Conte Rosso.

In July, Upholder encountered two Italian cruisers, Giuseppe Garibaldi and Raimondo Montecuccoli, steaming at about 22 knots and escorted by destroyers. Wanklyn originally intended to attack Montecuccoli, but shortly before firing, the ASDIC operator gave the cruisers an even higher speed, of around 28 knots, which meant that Upholder did not have a good enough position to attack her and so Wanklyn switched the attack to Garibaldi. Upholder fired two torpedoes, one of which was claimed as a hit but did not sink Garibaldi, though it did put her in port and out of action for some time.

Crawford was awarded the Distinguished Service Cross (DSC) on 2 September 1941 for "skill and enterprise in successful submarine patrols" from January to May 1941, an award confirmed shortly after Upholder's return from her 16th war patrol.

On 16 September, the crew of Upholder was recalled from shore leave in the middle of the afternoon and, with HMS Ursula, HMS Unbeaten and HMS Upright, sailed within a few hours to pursue intelligence reports of a troop convoy from Taranto passing to the east of Malta en route to Tripoli. Three of the submarines were put across the convoy's line of passage, with Upholder in the middle and Unbeaten and Upright on either side. Ursula was positioned fifty miles to the west in order to carry out a daylight attack in the early morning. Upholder attacked and sank the Italian merchant ships Neptunia and Oceania. A third ship in the convoy, Vulcania, escaped despite an attack by Ursula on 18 September with four torpedoes, one of which may have hit.

===== HMS Graph =====
In November 1941, Crawford left Upholder to return to the UK to undertake his submarine commander's course (known as "the Perisher"). Upon successful completion of that course, and while waiting for an H-boat to command, the commander of HMS Graph, captured German U-570, Lt. Edward Dudley Norman, became sick and Lt. Crawford took command of that vessel for about a week. Crawford found the U-boat's periscopes to be "superb", but noted that a great quantity of water would break over the bridge in even the slightest sea. He found the standard of comfort aboard to be inferior to British submarines. In particular, the wardroom arrangement was particularly uncomfortable because the passage from the crew compartment to the control room went right through the middle of the wardroom, so that any time any rating had to go on watch, the entire wardroom had to move.

===== HMS H50 =====
After his week in command of Graph, Crawford spent three months in command of HMS H50, which nominally operated from Rothesay, but was in fact mainly on detached service in Derry, where it gave anti-submarine training to the convoy escort groups based there.

===== HMS Unseen (P51) =====
In June 1942 Crawford took command of what was then "P51" at the Barrow shipyards. On 1 July she departed the yard for Holy Loch for sea trials and training.

On 29 July, she departed on her first war patrol. Unfortunately, during training of watch divers in surfacing and diving the submarine, when diving after taking a sun-sight to find her position, the petty officer on watch pulled the wrong lever, which resulted in high-pressure air being blown into the "Q"-tank with both vent and Kingston valve shut, which damaged the tank and the battery, forcing Unseen to go to Sheerness for repairs to the tank before setting off for the Mediterranean.

Crawford was sent for by Admiral Max Horton, Flag Officer Submarines at the time. Crawford expected a "most frightful rocket", but Horton took the matter "very well" and asked if Crawford could suggest anything to prevent such an event happening again. Crawford suggested that the lever for operating the valves for the Q-tank have some corrugations added to it so that even in dim light the operator could feel which tank he was operating. That suggestion was incorporated into all future submarines of that configuration.

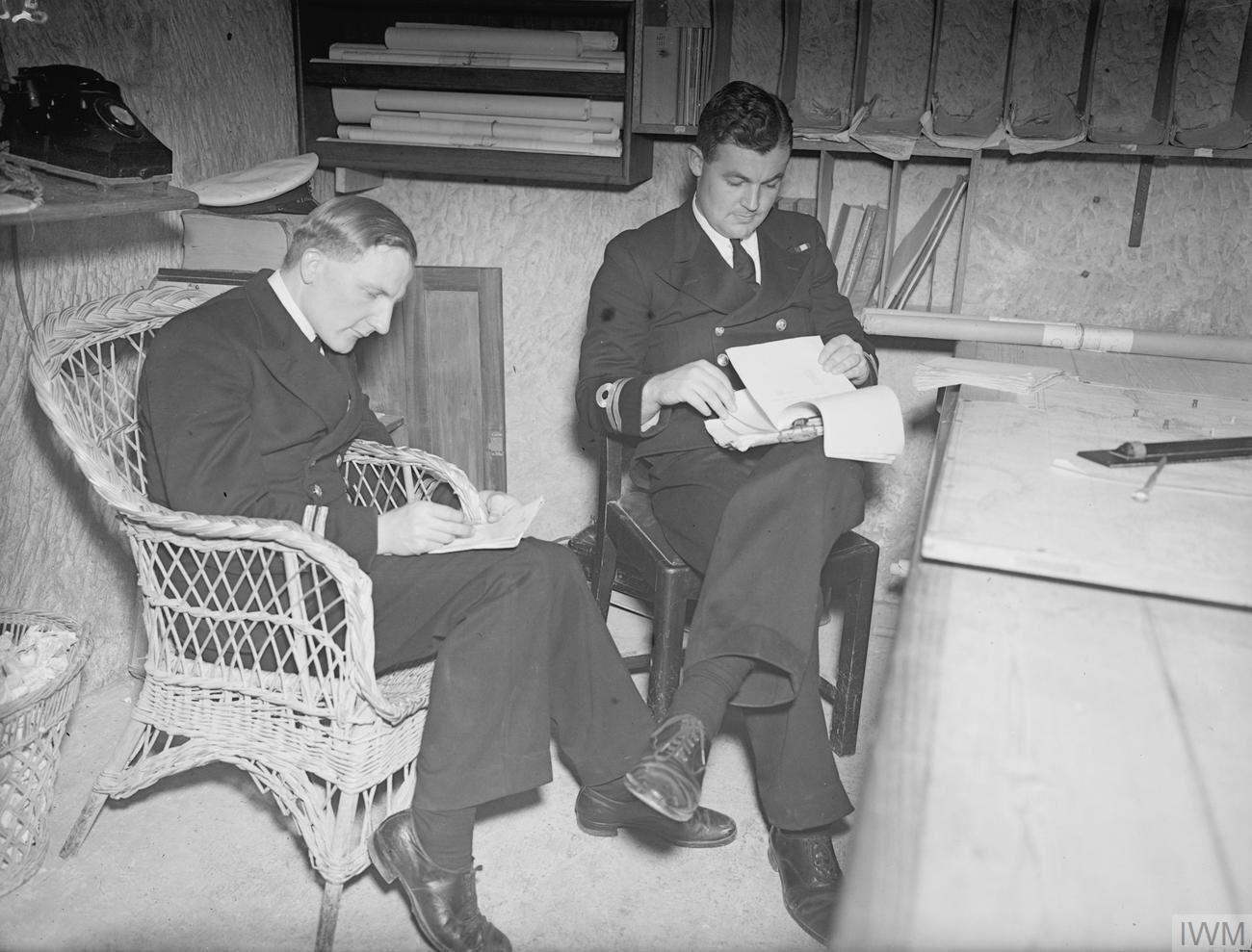
The commanding officer of P51, Lieut. Crawford (right), studying the latest reports on shipping movements with Lieut. E. Barlow

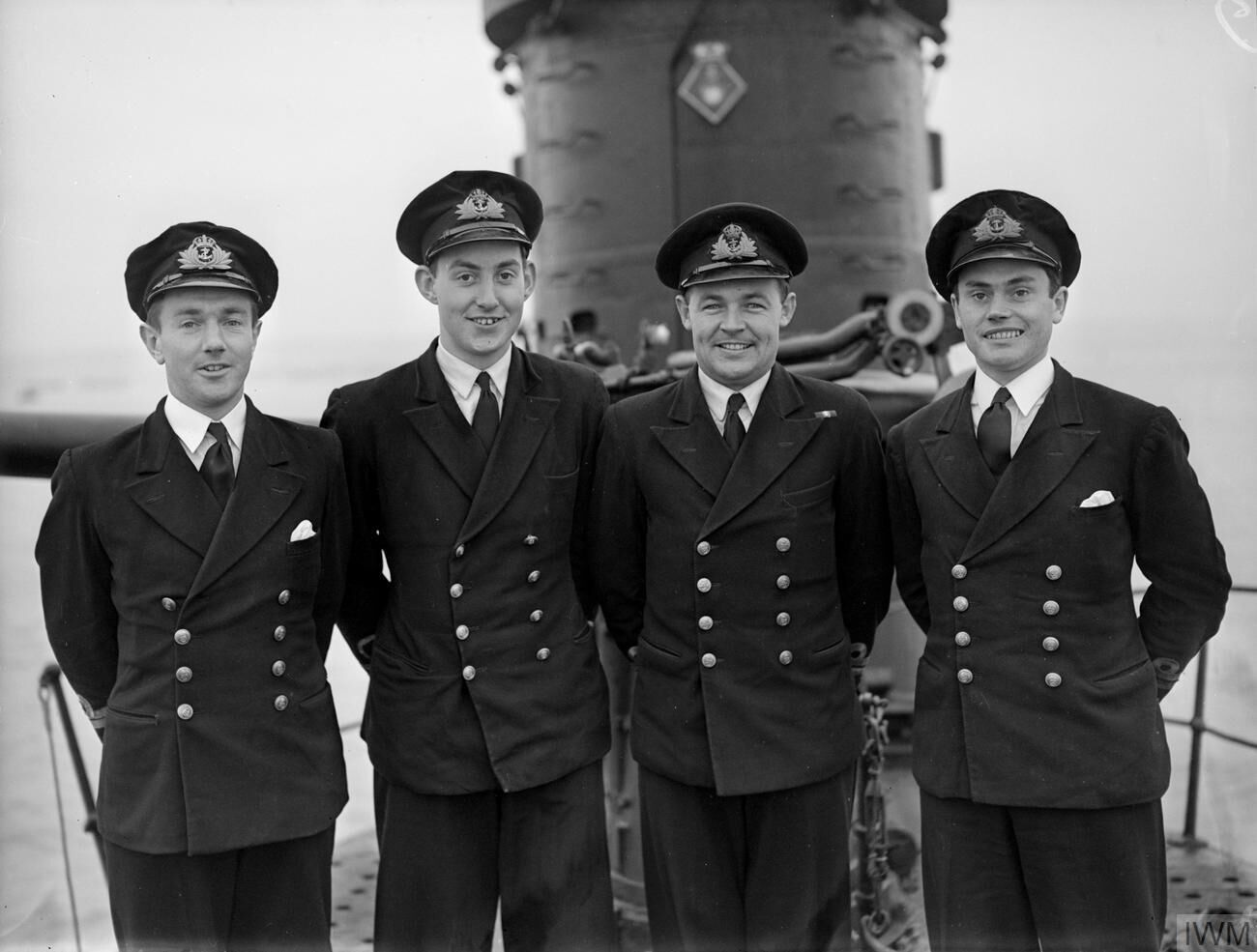
Officers of Unseen, 31 January 1944 (left to right): Lieut. W. T. J. Fox, Sub-Lieut. R. J. Linden, Lieut. Crawford, the commanding officer, and his first lieutenant, Lieut. R. T. Sallis

On 20 September, Unseen departed Portsmouth for Gibraltar. Her first lieutenant had had a wisdom tooth removed shortly before departure and began to bleed from the wound. The bleeding could not be stopped, and Unseen was forced to divert to Falmouth in order to obtain medical assistance at the local hospital. Unseen resumed her passage a few hours later. Upon arrival at Gibraltar, during October she conducted exercises and a short working-up patrol off Málaga.

In November, she was sent to the waters off Toulon to observe French naval movements in the days leading up to the start of Operation Torch. On or shortly before 13 November, Crawford awoke and went to the bridge where he saw a shape which the officer of the watch reported to him as an island. Crawford was "not impressed", as he knew there were no islands in the vicinity and sounded the night alarm. With engines stopped, they were able to hear the engines of a destroyer.

At that time, or perhaps one or two days later (the sources are not clear), Unseen was forced hurriedly to dive to avoid a destroyer, but she had already been spotted by the enemy. She was attacked with depth charges and began to sink fast. The crew managed to stop her at about 345 feet. The safe diving depth for the submarine was 200 feet according to standing instructions. The Q-tank was damaged once again, her navigational lights were blown off, a mass of caulking from the bulkheads was lost and electrical equipment was damaged. Unseen underwent repairs upon her return to Gibraltar. To celebrate their escape, Crawford ordered a diving helmet to be sewn onto Unseen's Jolly Roger when they returned to Malta the following month.

On 4 December, Unseen departed Gibraltar for Malta. Due to the severe shortage of supplies in Malta, she sailed with a "dummy deck" underfoot throughout the submarine which was composed of provisions. Her instructions en route were not to attack anything unless vital. She sighted a U-boat, U-561, at night and was preparing to attack when the U-boat saw her and escaped. Unseen arrived in Malta on 13 December. As the "new boy", he and Unseen spent Christmas on patrol off North Africa between 21 and 30 December, attacking two convoys and firing seven torpedoes, but scoring no hits. She was also attacked by enemy aircraft on several occasions and was depth-charged by a destroyer on one occasion, but sustained no damage.

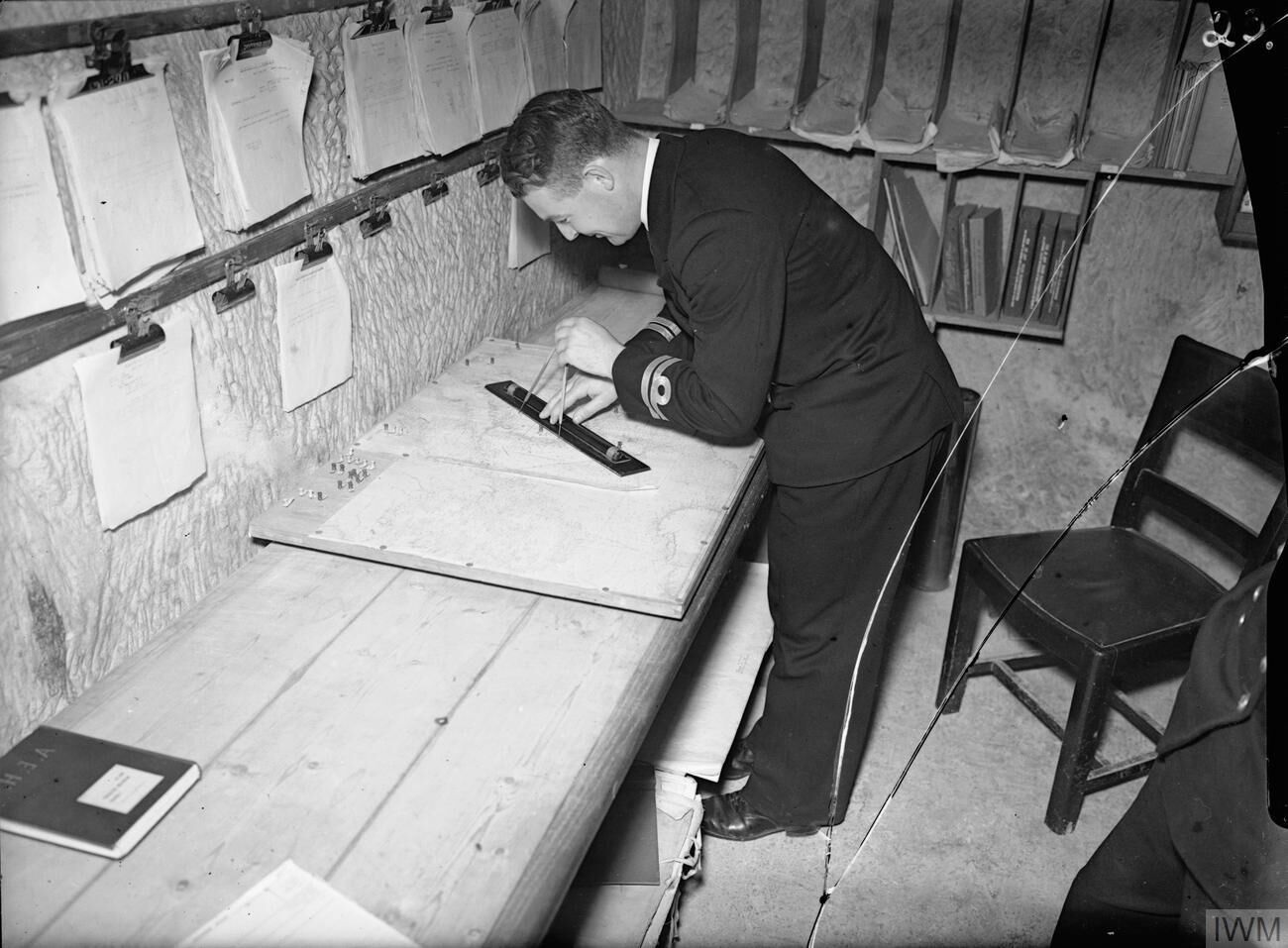
The commanding officer of P51, Lieut. Crawford, before setting out from Malta for a patrol in the Mediterranean

During her second patrol from Malta, on 17 January 1943 Unseen attacked and sank the Italian merchant Zenobia Martini off Tunisia and on 18 January the Italian merchant Sportivo off Libya. She had further success in subsequent patrols, sinking the Italian merchant Le Tre Marie off Punta Alice, Italy, on 4 February and the wreck of the German merchant Macedonia off Tunisia on 4 March. On 18 April, during a patrol off the north coast of Sicily, Unseen attacked and sank the German auxiliary submarine chaser UJ-2205.

In May Unseen engaged in trials of the use of "Chariot" human torpedoes. In late May and throughout June, Unseen took part in special operations delivering COPP parties for numerous beach reconnaissances, some by folbot and some by Chariot, to assist in selection of suitable amphibious landing areas for Operation Husky. On 6–9 July, Unseen performed the role of marker for the Husky landings, with Crawford, the hard work done, managing to sleep soundly through the initial landings themselves. He later recalled seeing the invasion fleet through the periscope and telling his first lieutenant, "Well, I’m going for a cup of ki [cocoa]. Call me as soon as anything happens." He put his feet on the sofa and slept through the first night of the invasion of Sicily.

On 20 July, Crawford was awarded a bar to his DSC for "successful patrols in H.M. submarines", in respect of seven patrols from Malta.

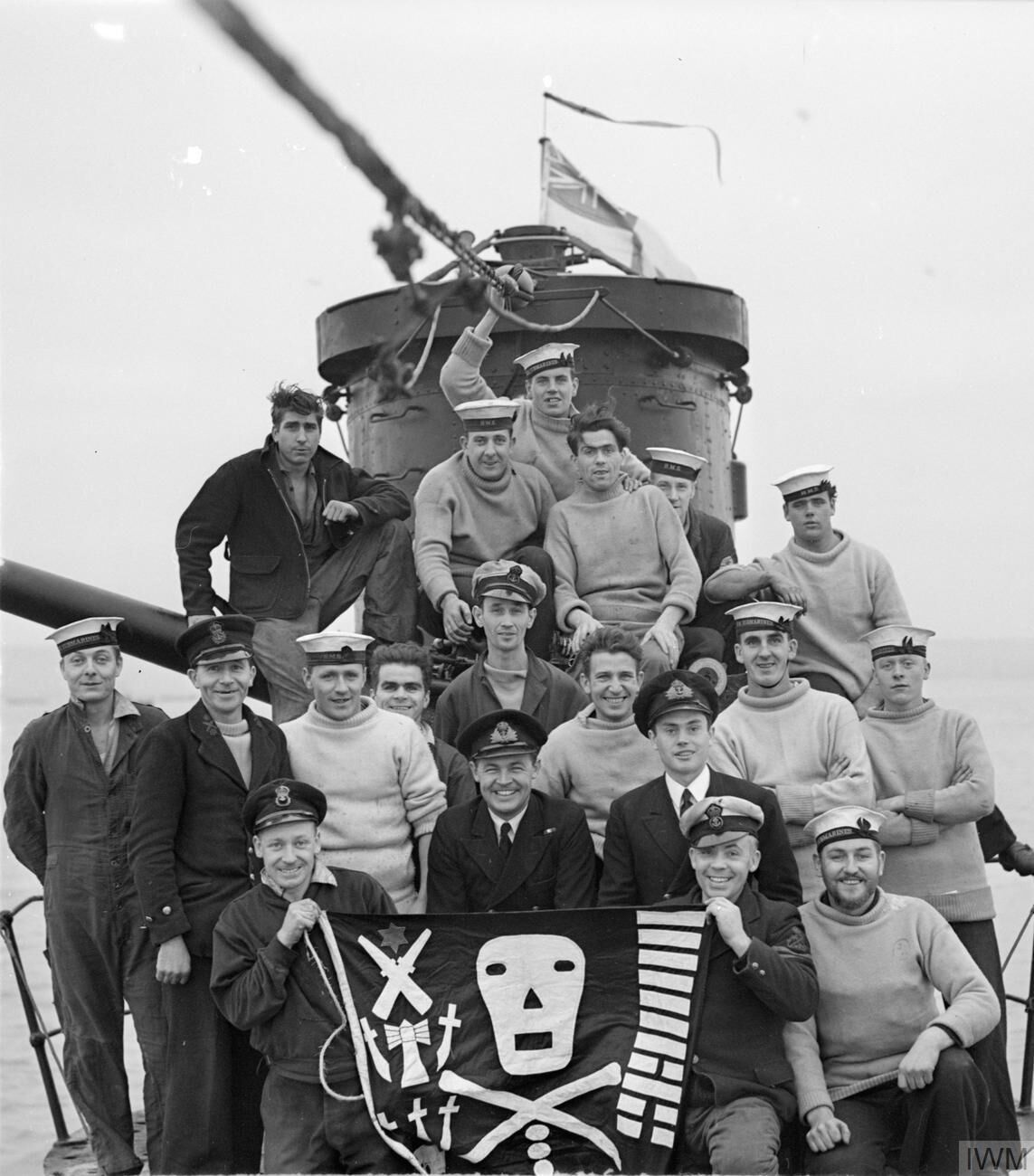
Crawford (centre), 1st lieutenant, Lieut. R. T. Sallis, and other members of the crew of Unseen display their Jolly Roger, 31 January 1944, Portsmouth

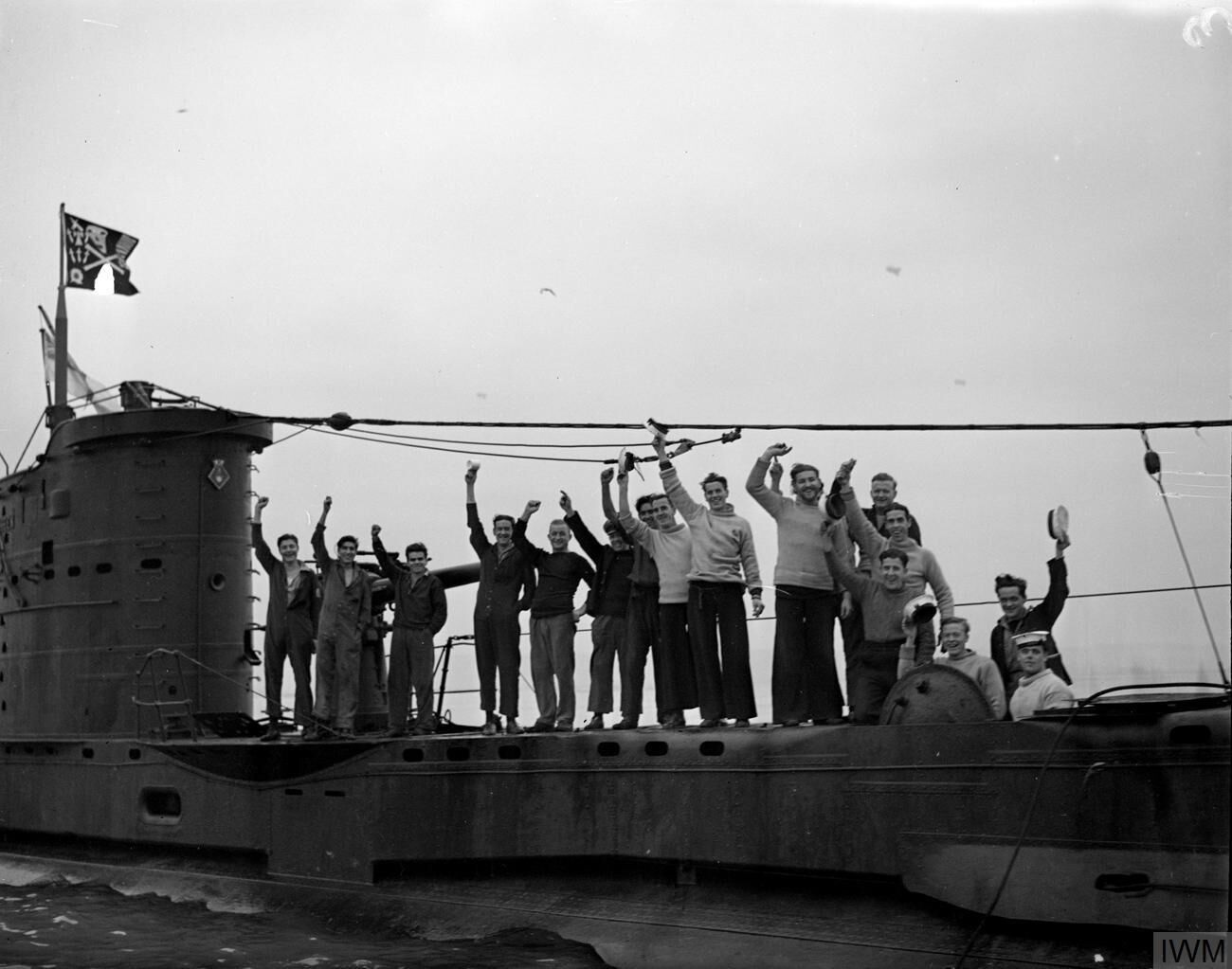
Unseen returns home from the Mediterranean, 31 January 1944, Portsmouth

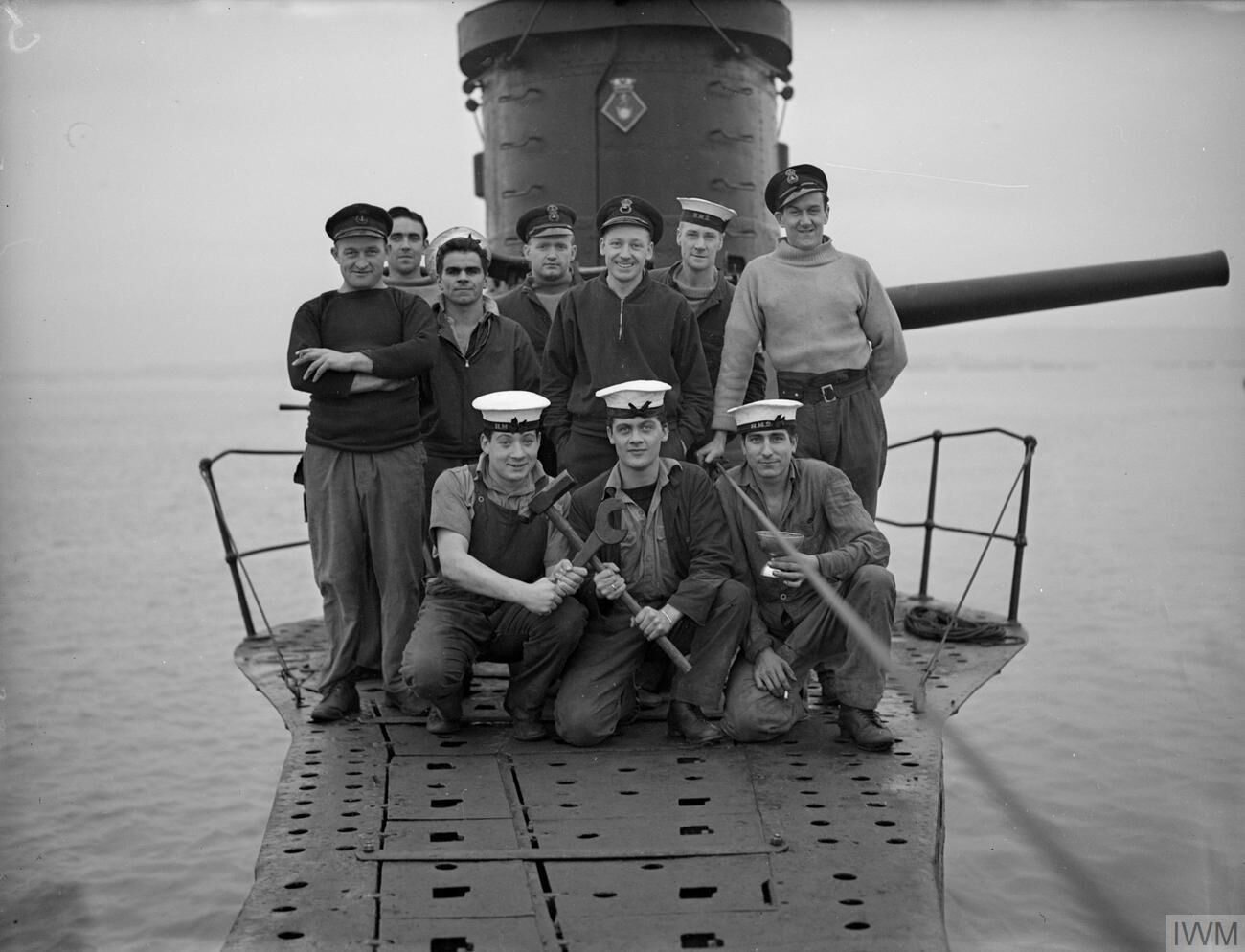
A group of stokers of Unseen, 31 January 1944, Portsmouth

In late July and early August 1943 Unseen took part in further beach reconnaissance, this time off the east coast of Calabria.

On 4 August, Unseen attacked the Italian light cruiser Luigi Cadorna, but without scoring a hit. An attack on the Italian merchantman Hermada on 24 August was also unsuccessful, but she did sink the Italian merchant ship Rastello on 27 August. On 28 August, Unseen sank an Italian auxiliary patrol vessel, V216/Fabiola, off Vlorë, Albania, with a mixture of gunfire and scuttling charges.

Unseen's next two engagements were her most successful of Crawford's time in command, at least in tonnage sunk. On 21 September 1943, Unseen torpedoed and sank the German mine-layer Brandenburg and the German night fighter direction vessel Kreta. By firing a full salvo when the two target ships were overlapping, Crawford achieved the remarkable result of sinking both. Unseen's final successful attack of the war came on 22 October when she sank the German landing barge F 541, and damaged another. On 4 January 1944, Unseen was ordered to Gibraltar and, after a detour via Algiers, arrived there on 11 January, departing for the UK on 18 January and arriving at Falmouth on 28 January.

Crawford was later mentioned in dispatches for "gallantry, skill and devotion to duty in successful patrols in H.M. submarines" in respect of the sinking of two ships and damage caused to two others, almost certainly in respect of these patrols in 1943 in Unseen (despite their being gazetted in April 1944).

===== HMS Oberon (N21) =====
Upon return to the UK, on 24 March 1944 Lieut. Crawford was sent to command HMS Oberon, which had served in reserve before the war and was largely used for training purposes during it. After a run to Rothesay and Scapa Flow, probably for training, she was decommissioned at Blyth on 5 July. Crawford married Margaret Hendy Lewis in Blyth in September 1944 and they settled in Portsmouth.

===== HMS Tireless (P327) =====
On 15 November 1944, Acting Lieut. Cmdr. Crawford took command of the new submarine Tireless. Shortly after the end of the war in Europe in May 1945, Tireless sailed to Holy Loch for trials and training. In September, after the end of the war, she completed her training and was dispatched to the Far East, where she served until 1946.

==== Postwar service ====
Crawford held numerous submarine-related appointments after the war, including commanding HMS Artemis from 1950–1951. He also held two general service appointments: one on the staff of the Commander-in-Chief, Home Fleet in the battleship HMS Vanguard 1951-53 and another the command of the frigate HMS Loch Fada 1955–56. Promoted to captain in 1959, he commanded the submarine depot ship HMS Forth 1961–62. He was chief staff officer to the Flag Officer Submarines based at HMS Dolphin, Gosport 1962-64 (under, successively, Rear Admirals Hugh Mackenzie and Horace Law), and in 1965-68 Commodore Superintendent, HM Naval Base Malta. From January to July 1968 Crawford served as Naval ADC to HM Queen Elizabeth II.

Crawford retired from the Royal Navy on 11 August 1968. He served as publications officer for Flag Officer Submarines at HMS Dolphin, Gosport, until 1980.

== Ships sunk ==
| Date | Ship | Combatant | Tonnage | Fate |
|---|---|---|---|---|
| 17 January 1943 | Zenobia Martini | Regia Marina | 1,454 | sunk at 33°55′N 11°02′E |
| 18 January 1943 | Sportivo | Regia Marina | 1,598 | sunk at 33°00′N 12°08′E |
| 5 February 1943 | Le Tre Marie | Regia Marina | 1,086 | sunk at 39°16′N 17°11′E |
| 18 April 1943 | UJ-2205 | Kriegsmarine | 1,168 | sunk at 38°15′N 13°13′E |
| 27 August 1943 | Rastello | Regia Marina | 985 | sunk at 41°30′N 17°27′E |
| 28 August 1943 | V 216 / Fabiola | Regia Marina | 103 | sunk at 40°30′N 19°05′E |
| 21 September 1943 | Brandenburg | Kriegsmarine | 3,895 | sunk at 43°08′N 09°58′E |
| 21 September 1943 | Kreta | Kriegsmarine | 2,600 | sunk at 43°08′N 09°58′E |

== Awards and decorations ==
Crawford was awarded the Distinguished Service Cross (DSC) on 2 September 1941, while First Lieutenant of Upholder, for "skill and enterprise in successful submarine patrols". He received a bar to his DSC on 20 July 1943, whilst in command of Unseen, for "successful patrols in H.M. submarines". Crawford was also mentioned in dispatches on 18 April 1944 for "gallantry, skill and devotion to duty in successful patrols in H.M. submarines", almost certainly in respect of his exploits in Unseen.

== Death ==
Captain Crawford died on 28 June 2017, one day after his 100th birthday. He was the last surviving commander of a submarine in the "Fighting Tenth" submarine flotilla. His wife Margaret died in October 2019. He is survived by their children, Simon, an artist, and Rosemary, an administrator, four grandchildren and four great-grandchildren. The couple's older sons, Michael, an electrical engineer, and David, a banker, predeceased him.
