= Cowley Thomas =

Captain in the Royal Navy

Captain Cowley Thomas CBE
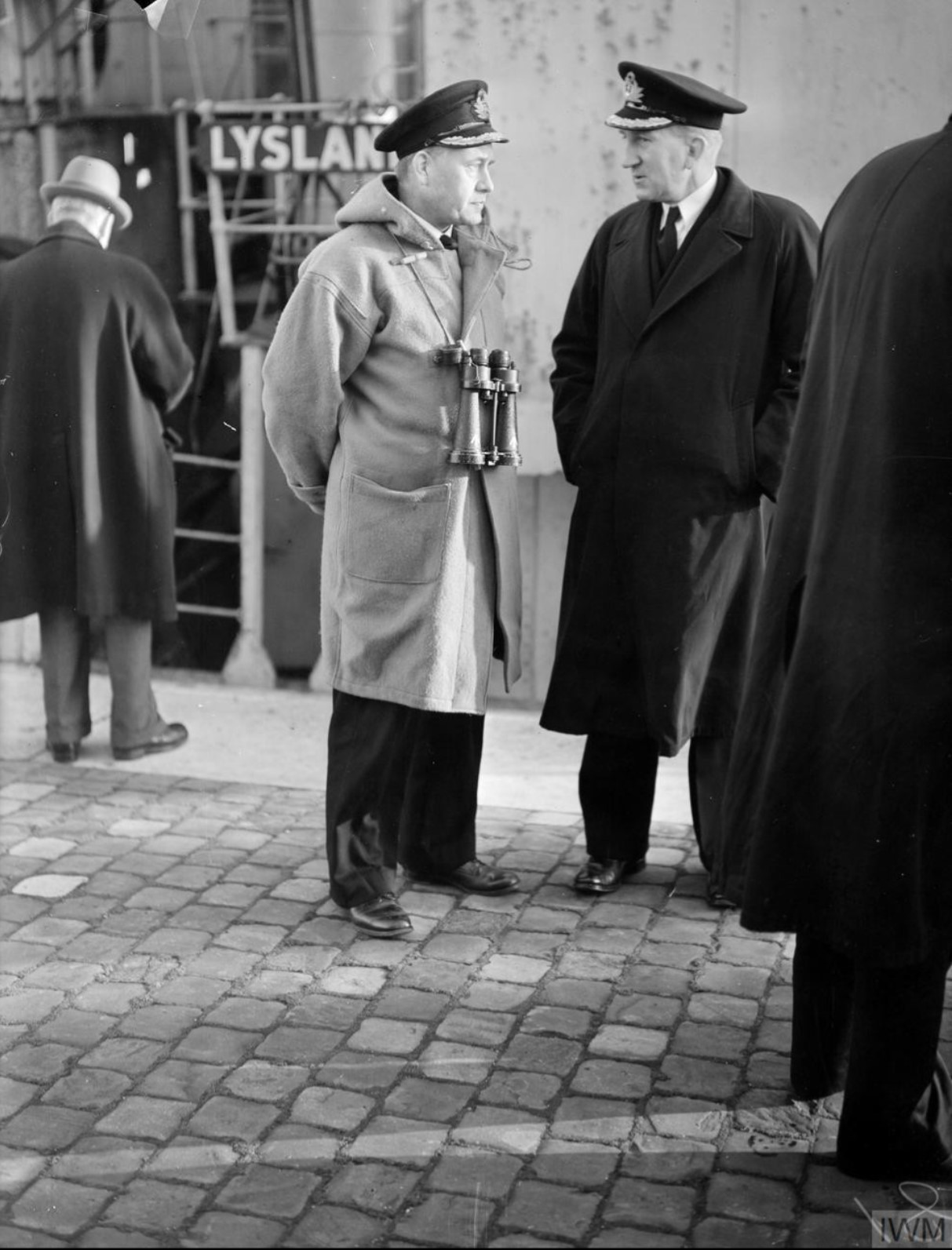
- Cowley Thomas (right) with Commodore Mulhall, RNR, Commodore of the first convoy of Coasters to arrive at Antwerp
- Born: William Cowley Thomas; 27 June 1900; Barry, Vale of Glamorgan, Wales
- Died: 4 September 1977 (aged 77); Hove, Sussex, England
- Relatives: Anthony St Ledger (father-in-law)
- Military career
- Allegiance: United Kingdom
- Branch: Royal Navy
- Service years: 1917–1934, 1938–1945
- Rank: Captain
- Commands: HMS H31; HMS L21; HMS Odin
- Conflicts: World War I; World War II; Norwegian campaign; Battle of Greece; Battle of Crete; North African Campaign; Allied invasion of Sicily; Italian campaign; Operation Overlord; Allied advance from Paris to the Rhine; Western Allied invasion of Germany
- Awards: Commander of the Order of the British Empire (1946); Officer of the Order of the British Empire (1945); Mentioned in Despatches (1943, 1945); Commander of the Order of Leopold (Belgium) (1946)

Cowley Thomas, CBE (27 June 1900 - September 1977) was a captain in the Royal Navy who served in Great War and World War II. Between the wars he served in the Royal Navy Submarine Service. He retired in 1934, but was recalled to active duty in 1938. During the Second World War he served as the Naval Officer in Charge of Tripoli, Bizerta, Taranto, Port-en-Bessin and Antwerp.

== Early life ==
William Cowley Thomas was born in Barry, Vale of Glamorgan, Wales, on 27 June 1900, the son of Henry John Thomas, a stockbroker. He joined the Royal Navy s a midshipman on 1 May 1917, and served on the battleship HMS Royal Oak during the Great War.

== Between the wars ==
Thomas was promoted to acting sub-lieutenant on 15 January 1919. This became substantive on 15 September 1919. He was then promoted to acting lieutenant on 15 August 1921. After training on the yacht HMS Triad, he joined the Royal Navy Submarine Service. He served in the Mediterranean as an officer on the submarine HMS L69 from September 1924 until May 1926. He then joined the cruiser HMS Dartmouth. On 24 May 1928, he returned to submarines as an officer on the submarine HMS L54. He assumed command of the submarine HMS H31 on 24 May 1929. He was promoted to lieutenant commander on 15 August 1929, and served on the cruiser HMS London in the Mediterranean from 21 April 1930 until 16 August 1931.

On 31 December, he assumed command of the submarine HMS L21. He married Patricia Hamilton on 16 November 1931, and officially changed his name to just "Cowley Thomas". On 27 January 1933 he joined the submarine depot ship HMS Medway on the China station. Then, on 4 May 1933, he assumed command of the submarine HMS Odin. He retired at his own request on 25 May 1934.

== Second World War ==
On 29 September 1938, Thomas was recalled to active duty, and joined the crew of the battleship HMS Rodney. On 13 August 1939, he joined the cruiser HMS York, where he was serving when the Second World War broke out. He was promoted to commander on 27 June 1940. After it was sunk by the Italians in the Raid on Souda Bay, he was assigned to HMS Nile, the Royal Navy shore establishment in Egypt, and served on the staff of the Commander-in-Chief, Mediterranean Fleet. He married a second time on 10 September 1941, to Mary Fedora Douglas-Watson, a pianist and composer. She was the widow of a fellow naval officer, Commander Francis Douglas-Watson, and the daughter of former Australian senator Anthony St Ledger.

Thomas became the Naval Officer in Charge (NOIC) in Tripoli on 1 March 1943, and HMS Hasdrubal (the naval base at Bizerta) on 1 July 1943. He participated in the Allied Invasion of Sicily, for which he was mentioned in despatches. He became the NOIC at Taranto in Italy on 9 September 1943. He returned to the UK in February 1944, and became the NOIC on the Isle of Wight, with the acting rank of captain. He earned a second mention in despatches for his role in Operation Overlord, the Allied invasion of Normandy, during which he served as NOIC of Port-en-Bessin, the main petroleum port for the Allied forces. For his "skill, resource and organisation in the opening-up of Port-en-Bessin", he was made an Officer of the Order of the British Empire on 9 March 1945. From September 1944 until 22 October 1945, he was the NOIC of Antwerp in Belgium, the largest port serving the Allied forces.

== Later life ==
On 18 December 1945, with the war over, Thomas was placed on the retired list again. For his services, he was made a Commander of the Belgian Order of Leopold, and was advanced to the rank of Commander of the Order of the British Empire in the 1946 Birthday Honours.

Thomas died in Hove, Sussex, on 4 September 1977. He had no children.
