= Howard Bone =

Highly decorated Royal Navy submarine commander of WW2

- Born: 20 October 1908; Chatham, Kent
- Died: 12 August 1981 (aged 72); Combe Hay, Somerset
- Military career
- Allegiance: United Kingdom
- Branch: Royal Navy
- Service years: 1922-1957
- Rank: Captain
- Commands: HMS Sealion; HMS Tigris; HMS Otway; HMS Montclare; Naval Base Simon's Town
- Conflicts: Second World War
- Awards: Commander of the Order of the British Empire; Distinguished Service Order & Bar; Distinguished Service Cross & Bar

Captain Howard Francis Bone CBE DSO* DSC* (20 October 1908 – 12 August 1981) was a British Royal Navy officer, who was highly decorated during his service as a submarine commander during the Second World War.

== Early life ==
Bone was the son of Howard Bone CB and Annie Stewart Wyatt. He was educated at Felsted School, before attending the Britannia Royal Naval College. He entered the Royal Navy on 15 May 1922.

== Naval career ==
Bone's first saw service on HMS Frobisher in China, before attending a promotion course at the Royal Naval College, Greenwich in 1929. He then served on various submarines, before taking command of HMS Sealion on 25 July 1937. He served on HMS Ark Royal between October 1938 and August 1939.

=== Second World War ===
On 6 June 1940 Bone took command of HMS Tigris. On 13 November 1940 he was awarded the Distinguished Service Order for good service on patrols in home waters. On 20 December 1940 he was awarded the Distinguished Service Cross for the successful sinking of an Italian submarine. He was awarded a Bar to his DSO for patrols conducted in June and July 1941, and was awarded a Bar to his DSC for successful patrols between August and November 1941. On 13 September 1941 Bone was responsible for the torpedoing of a Norwegian civilian vessel, which had been mistaken for a German ship; 97 civilians died in the incident. He documented the event in the ship log: "1203 hours - Fired two torpedoes from 1500 yards. One hit was obtained and the ship sank immediately. Survivors were seen on four rafts and these were seen to be picked up by a fishing vessel that was in the area. Tigris retired to the seaward."

Between August and November 1942 he commanded HMS Otway. For the remainder of the war he served as an executive officer on the submarine depot ships HMS Maidstone and HMS Wolfe.

=== Post-war ===
In January 1946 Bone became executive officer on HMS Howe. In 1950 he briefly served as commanding officer of HMS Montclare, before serving as Deputy Director of Naval Equipment at the Admiralty until 1954. Between 1954 and 1957 he was Captain-in-Charge of Naval Base Simon's Town in South Africa. From January 1956 to his retirement in May 1957 Bone was also a Naval Aide-de-camp to Elizabeth II. He was made a Commander of the Order of the British Empire in the 1957 Birthday Honours.
