= N92 =

N92 may refer to:

- Alawa language
- HMS Otus (N92), a submarine of the Royal Navy
- Nebraska Highway 92, in the United States
- Nokia N92, a mobile phone
- Vaginal bleeding
