= Capitan O'Brien-class submarine (1928) =

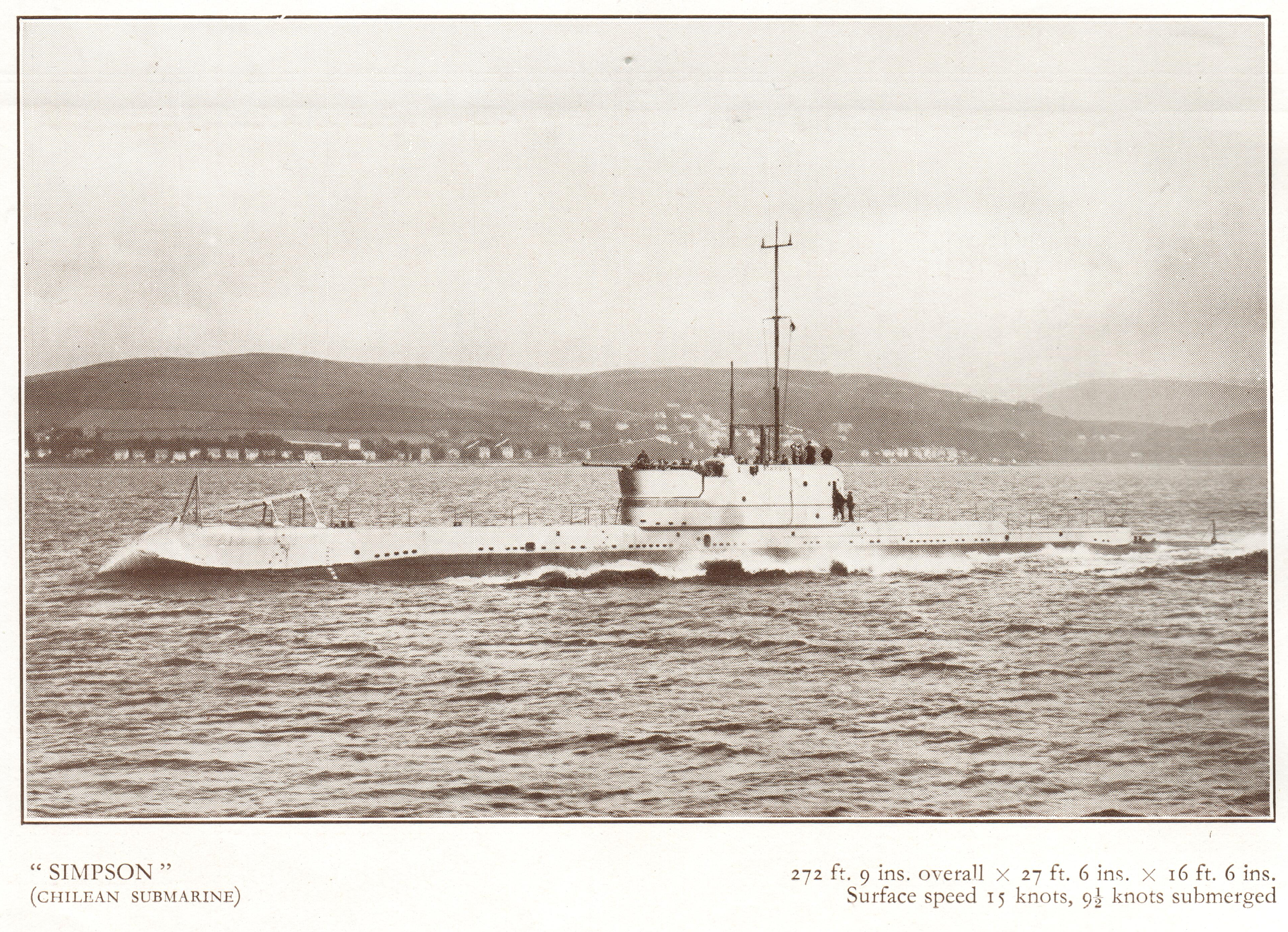
- Capitan Simpson

Class overview
- Name: Capitan O'Brien class
- Builders: Vickers
- Operators: Chilean Navy
- Built: 1928–1929
- In commission: 1929–1958
- Completed: 3
- Retired: 3

General characteristics
- Type: Submarine
- Displacement: Surfaced - 1,540 long tons (1,560 t); Submerged - 2,020 long tons (2,050 t)
- Length: 260 ft (79 m) pp
- Beam: 28 ft (8.5 m)
- Draught: 13 ft 6 in (4.11 m)
- Propulsion: 2 shaft diesel-electric; Vickers diesel engines: 2,750 bhp (2,050 kW); Electric motors: 1,300 hp (970 kW)
- Speed: Surfaced: 15 knots (28 km/h; 17 mph); Submerged: 9 knots (17 km/h; 10 mph)
- Complement: 54
- Armament: 8 × 21 in (533 mm) torpedo tubes (6 bow, 2 stern 14 torpedoes); 1 × 4.7 in (119 mm)/45 deck gun

The Capitan O'Brien class were three submarines built for the Chilean Navy in the late 1920s. Designed and built in the United Kingdom, they were a modified design of the contemporary British Odin-class submarines. The lead boat, Capitan O'Brien, was launched on 2 October 1928 and the other two on 15 January 1929. All three submarines entered service in 1929. The three vessels remained in service until being discarded in 1957–1958.

== Background and design ==
The Capitan O'Brien class were three submarines constructed to a modified design based on the British Royal Navy's Odin class. The Odin class was the Royal Navy's leading submarine design in the post-World War I era, equipped with strengthened pressure hulls and fuel carried in the ballast tanks to improve rapid diving. They had an extended surface range. The Capitan O'Briens measured 260 feet (79 m) long between perpendiculars with a beam of 28 ft (8.5 m) and a draught of 13 ft 6 in (4.11 m). They had a displacement of 1,540 long tons (1,560 t) while surfaced and 2,020 long tons (2,050 t) submerged. The submarines were propelled by two shafts powered by two Vickers diesel engines creating 2,750 brake horsepower (2,050 kW) while surfaced and two electric motors creating 1,300 hp (970 kW) while submerged. This gave them a maximum speed of 15 knots (28 km/h; 17 mph) when surfaced and 9 knots (17 km/h; 10 mph) while submerged. The builder's photograph of Capitan Simpson gives the dimensions as 272 feet 9 inches (83.1 m) long overall with a beam of 27 feet 6 inches (8.4 m) and a draught of 16 feet 6 inches (5.0 m) with a surface speed of 15 knots and 9.5 knots (17.6 km/h; 10.9 mph) when submerged.

The Capitan O'Briens had a large conning tower that stretched one-third of the deck and mounted the 4.7-inch (119 mm)/45 deck gun in a turret. The submarines were also armed with eight 21 in (533 mm) torpedo tubes, with six located in the bow and two in the stern. The subs carried 14 torpedoes. Each submarine had a complement of 54 personnel.

== Ships ==
Capitan O'Brien class construction data
| Name | Builder | Launched | Decommissioned |
|---|---|---|---|
| Capitan O'Brien | Vickers-Armstrongs, Barrow-in-Furness | 2 October 1928 | 1957 |
| Almirante Simpson | Vickers-Armstrongs, Barrow-in-Furness | 15 January 1929 | 1957 |
| Capitan Thomson | Vickers-Armstrongs, Barrow-in-Furness | 15 January 1929 | 1958 |

== Cited works ==
- Cocker, Maurice (2008). Royal Navy Submarines: 1901 to the Present Day. Barnsley, UK: Pen and Sword Books Ltd. ISBN 978-1-84415-733-4.
- Scheina, Robert L. (1980). "Chile". In Chesneau, Roger (ed.). Conway's All the World's Fighting Ships 1922–1946. Greenwich, UK: Conway Maritime Press. pp. 422–423. ISBN 0-85177-146-7.
- Vickers-Armstrongs Limited (1930). The Activities of Vickers-Armstrongs Limited, naval construction works, Barrow-in-Furness. London: Vickers-Armstrongs Ltd. OCLC 13323843.
