= HMS Cyclops (F31) =

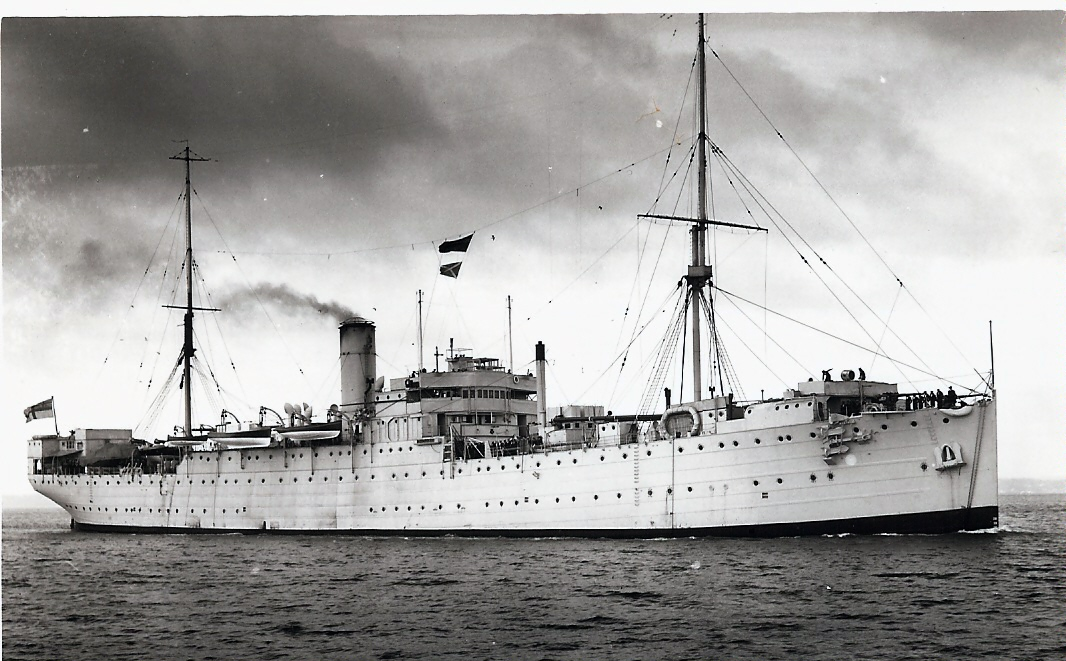
- HMS Cyclops off the Isle of Bute, circa 1943

History

United Kingdom
- Name: HMS Cyclops
- Builder: Sir James Laing & Son, Sunderland
- Launched: 27 October 1905
- Commissioned: 5 November 1907
- Nickname(s): Cycle Box
- Fate: Scrapped in 1947

General characteristics
- Displacement: 11,300 long tons (11,500 t)
- Length: 145.1 m (476 ft 1 in) o/a
- Beam: 16.8 m (55 ft 1 in)
- Draught: 2.51 m (8 ft 3 in)
- Propulsion: Triple Expansion Engines = 1100 indicated horse power
- Speed: 13 knots (15 mph; 24 km/h); 25.5 kn (29.3 mph; 47.2 km/h) full
- Complement: 266
- Armament: Two 4 inch MkV naval guns

HMS Cyclops (F31) was a submarine repair and depot ship of the Royal Navy. She was originally the passenger liner Indrabarah sister ship to Indralema, built by Laing, for the Indra Line Ltd then bought by The Admiralty, while she was building. She was launched on 27 October 1905.

Cyclops was 460 feet (140.2 m) long between perpendiculars and 476 feet (145.1 m) overall, with a beam of 55 feet (16.8 m).

== Career ==
Cyclops served during the First World War as a repair ship with the Grand Fleet where she served the entire conflict based at Scapa Flow. She was paid off on 1 April 1919, then was recommissioned for White Sea duty at Archangel. She returned to Chatham in October 1919 and on 31 January 1920 went into reserve for refit and conversion to a submarine depot ship, commissioning for the 1st Submarine Flotilla, Atlantic Fleet, on 21 December 1922 at Chatham Dockyard.

Between the wars HMS Cyclops served in Malta and was in reserve at the start of the Second World War before returning to Home Waters in late 1939 as the depot ship for the Royal Navy's 7th Submarine Flotilla based in Rothesay.

Between November 1939 and May 1940 Cyclops was the depot ship for the 3rd Submarine Flotilla, based at Parkeston Quay, Harwich Harbour. Her six S-class submarines reconnoitred and raided in the Heligoland Bight and off Denmark. She was nicknamed "Cycle Box". In December 1939 she used her 4-inch guns to engage a German seaplane attacking the harbour.

On 6 May 1942, HMS H28, HMS H32 and HMS P614 conducted practice attacks on a convoy made up of the submarine tenders Cyclops, HMS Titania and their escort HMS Breda, HMS La Capricieuse and HMS Boarhound.

She was commanded by Cdr. Benjamin Bryant DSO, DSC, RN, from 30 October 1944 to 4 February 1945.

== Facilities ==
Cyclops was equipped with a distillation plant for fresh water, machinery, carpenters' and blacksmiths' shops, coppersmiths', iron and brass foundries.

== Fate ==
Cyclops was sold to John Cashmore Ltd and scrapped at Newport in July 1947.

== See also ==
- Submarine depot ships
- HMS Ambrose (1914)
- HMS Hazard (1894)
- HMS Medway (1928)
- HMS Titania

== Publications ==
- Colledge, J. J.; Warlow, Ben (2006) [1969]. Ships of the Royal Navy: The Complete Record of All Fighting Ships of the Royal Navy from the 15th Century to the Present (3rd Rev ed.). London: Chatham Publishing. ISBN 978-1-86176-281-8. OCLC 67375475.
- Dittmar, F.J.; Colledge, J.J. (1972). British Warships 1914–1919. Shepperton, UK: Ian Allan. ISBN 0-7110-0380-7.
- "H.M.S. Cyclops, Floating Repair Shop for the Navy" (PDF). The Engineer. 108: 77–79. 23 July 1909.
- J P Foynes "The Battle of the East Coast 1939-1945" and "Who was to Blame for the Loss of HMS Gipsy".
- G W G Simpson "Periscope View".
