= Benjamin Bryant (Royal Navy officer) =

Rear-Admiral Benjamin Bryant CB DSO & Two Bars DSC
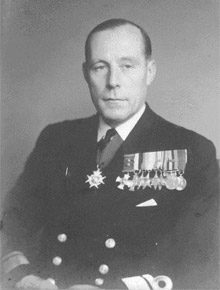
- Rear Admiral Benjamin Bryant, 1957
- Born: 16 September 1905; Madras, Madras Presidency, British India
- Died: 23 November 1994 (aged 89); Worthing, West Sussex, England
- Military career
- Allegiance: United Kingdom
- Branch: Royal Navy
- Service years: 1919–1957
- Rank: Rear-Admiral
- Commands: HMS Glasgow (1953–54); HMNB Devonport (1951–53); Royal Navy Submarine School (1947–49); HMS Adamant (1945–47); HMS Forth (1945); HMS Cyclops (1944–45); HMS Montclare (1944); HMS Safari (1941–43); HMS Sealion (1938–41)
- Conflicts: Second World War: Norwegian Campaign; Battle of the Atlantic
- Awards: Companion of the Order of the Bath; Distinguished Service Order & Two Bars; Distinguished Service Cross; Mentioned in Despatches

Rear-Admiral Benjamin Bryant, CB, DSO & Two Bars, DSC (16 September 1905 – 23 November 1994) was a Royal Navy officer noted for his submarine exploits during the Second World War. In terms of ships sunk, Bryant was the most successful British submarine commander to survive the war. He was appointed Deputy Chief of Naval Personnel, (Training) from July 1954 to February 1957.

== Early life ==
Bryant was born in Madras, British India, then the winter capital of the Madras Presidency; his father, John Forbes Bryant, was a member of the Indian Civil Service. His mother was Mary Ada (née Genge). He had an elder brother Joseph and elder sister May. Bryant returned from India as a boy and attended Oundle School and then the Royal Naval College, Osborne and Royal Naval College, Dartmouth.

Bryant published a book, One Man Band: The Memoirs of a Submarine C.O., in 1958 about his experience up to and including the Second World War.

== Second World War ==
As a lieutenant commander, Bryant served aboard HMS Sealion from 3 September 1938 to 12 October 1941. He then commanded HMS Safari from 14 October 1941 to 27 April 1943, the submarine depot ship HMS Montclare from 16 June 1944 to 10 October 1944, and the submarine depot ship HMS Cyclops from 30 October 1944 to 4 February 1945. Following promotion to captain, he commanded the submarine depot ship HMS Forth from 5 February to 11 May 1945, which was followed by command of HMS Adamant from 26 June 1945 to 4 June 1947.

For his services during the Second World War, Bryant was awarded the Distinguished Service Cross on 9 May 1940, Mentioned in Despatches on 12 May 1942, and awarded the Distinguished Service Order (DSO) on 23 March 1943, which was followed by two Bars to the DSO on 11 May and 6 July the same year. He was later appointed a Companion of the Order of the Bath in 1956.
