= HMS Talisman (N78) =

Submarine of the Royal Navy

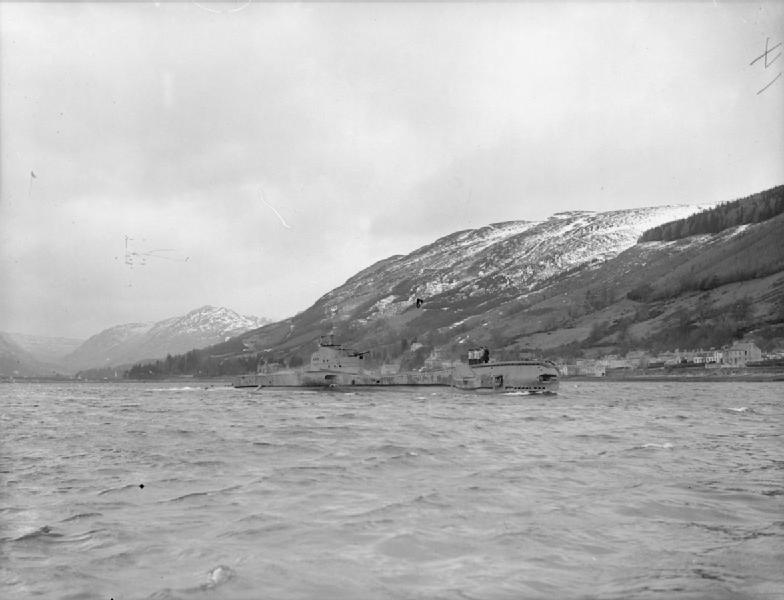
- HMS Talisman

History

United Kingdom
- Builder: Cammell Laird & Co Limited, Birkenhead
- Laid down: 27 September 1938
- Launched: 29 January 1940
- Commissioned: 29 June 1940
- Identification: Pennant number N78
- Fate: Sunk 17 September 1942
- Badge

General characteristics
- Class & type: British T class submarine
- Displacement: 1,090 tons surfaced; 1,575 tons submerged
- Length: 275 ft (84 m)
- Beam: 26 ft 6 in (8.08 m)
- Draught: 16.3 ft (5.0 m)
- Propulsion: Two shafts; Twin diesel engines 2,500 hp (1.86 MW) each; Twin electric motors 1,450 hp (1.08 MW) each
- Speed: 15.25 knots (28.7 km/h) surfaced; 9 knots (20 km/h) submerged
- Range: 4,500 nautical miles at 11 knots (8,330 km at 20 km/h) surfaced
- Test depth: 300 ft (91 m) max
- Complement: 59
- Armament: 6 internal forward-facing 21-inch (533 mm) torpedo tubes; 4 external forward-facing torpedo tubes; 6 reload torpedoes; 1 × 4-inch (102 mm) deck gun

The second HMS Talisman (N78), and the first to enter service under the name, was a T-class submarine of the Royal Navy. She was laid down by Cammell Laird & Co Limited, Birkenhead and launched on 29 January 1940.

== Career ==
Talisman had a relatively short but active career, spending most of her time in the Mediterranean.

One of her first actions was the capture of the French fishing vessel Le Clipper, which was then used to observe U-boat movements off the Gironde estuary before being brought into Falmouth, Cornwall. She later attacked HMS Otus by mistake, but was unsuccessful. She went on to sink two sailing vessels with its deck gun, the Vichy-French passenger ship Théophile Gautier and the Italian merchant Calitea, as well as destroying the grounded wreck of the German merchant Yalova. She also unsuccessfully attacked the German merchant Salzburg and an Italian convoy, missing the Italian merchant Lauretta, and being heavily depth charged by the escorting Italian torpedo boat Libra.

== Sinking ==
Talisman left Gibraltar on 10 September 1942 carrying supplies to Malta, where she was due no later than 18 September. She reported sighting a U-boat off Philippeville, Algeria on 15 September; a Gibraltar-based Sunderland of 202 Squadron was sent out and caught the Italian submarine, probably the Alabastro, on the surface and sank her.

Nothing was heard from Talisman again and she failed to arrive at Malta. She is presumed either to have hit an Italian mine off Sicily or to have been destroyed by Italian surface forces on 17 September. She was declared overdue on 18 September 1942.
