= HMS Adamant (A164) =

1942 depot ship

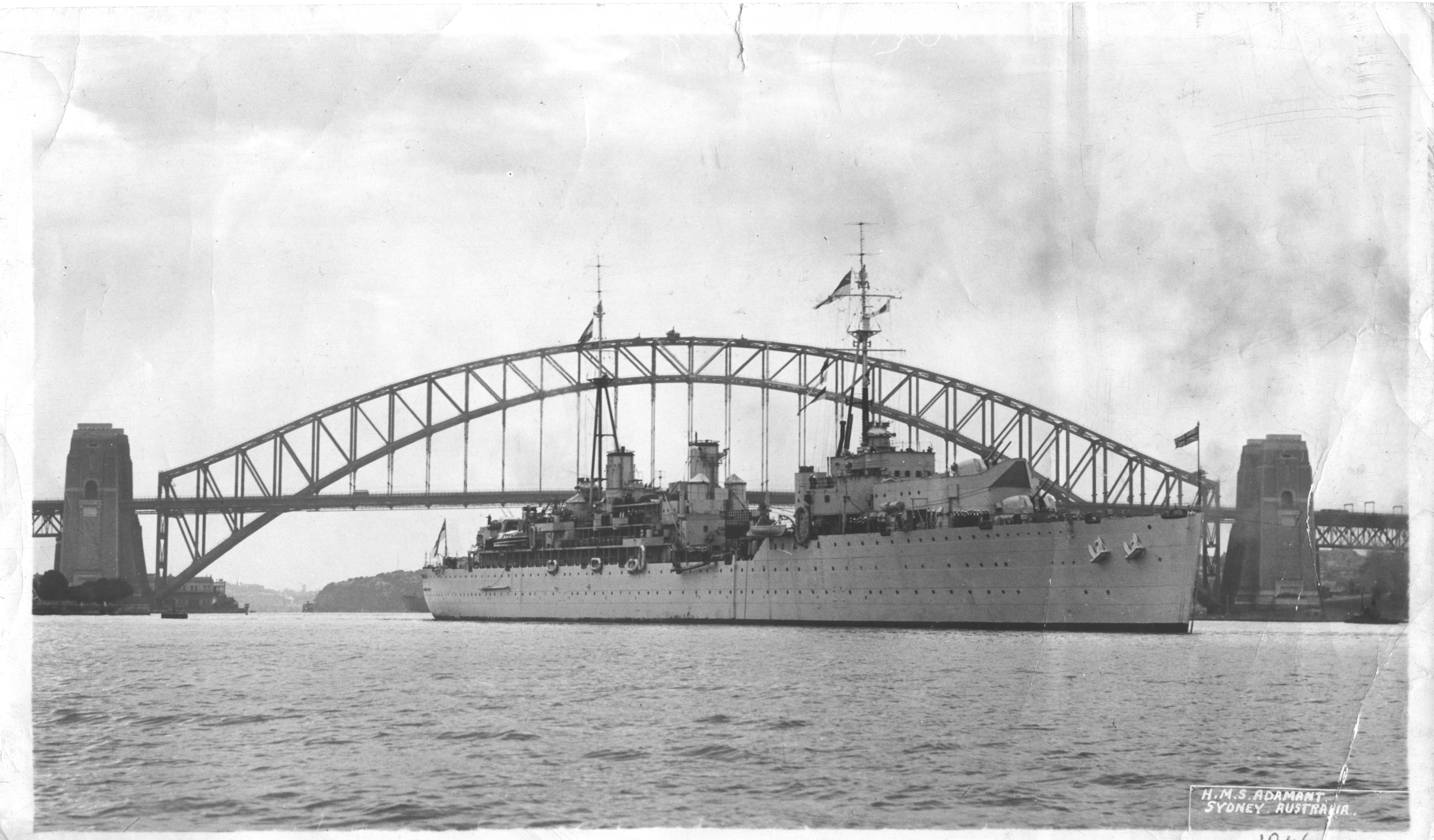
- HMS Adamant

History

United Kingdom
- Ordered: 1 March 1939
- Builder: Harland & Wolff, Belfast
- Yard number: 1023
- Laid down: 18 May 1939
- Launched: 30 November 1940
- Completed: 28 February 1942
- Commissioned: 28 February 1942
- Stricken: March 1966
- Motto: "Lead On"
- Fate: Broken up September 1970 at Inverkeithing

General characteristics
- Displacement: 12,500 tons (12,700 metric tonnes) unloaded; 16,500 tons (16,765 metric tonnes) loaded
- Length: 189 m (620 ft) (pp) 200.5 m (oa)
- Beam: 21.5 m (71 ft)
- Draught: 5.5 m (18 ft) full load
- Propulsion: 8,000 shp (6,000 kW) geared turbines
- Speed: 17 knots maximum
- Complement: 1273
- Armament: 8 × 4.5" DP Guns (in pairs); 16 × 2-pounder AA (in fours); 8 × 20 mm AA (singles); 8 × 0.5-inch (12.7 mm) AA (in fours); Carried in store 117 21" torpedoes
- Armour: 1 inch torpedo bulkhead, 2 inch armoured deck

HMS Adamant was a World War II submarine depot ship.

Completed in 1942, she served in the Eastern Fleet (Colombo/Trincomalee) with the 4th Submarine Flotilla (comprising nine T-class boats) from April 1943 until April 1945 and then moved with her flotilla to Fremantle, Australia. By 1947 Adamant had departed Australia for Hong Kong. In 1948, she returned to England, where she remained until 1954 as flagship of the Senior Officer, Reserve Fleet, Portsmouth. In 1953 she took part in the fleet review to celebrate the Coronation of Queen Elizabeth II.

In October 1954, she was commissioned as depot ship to the 3rd Submarine Squadron at Rothesay, where she was based until October 1957. She then moved further up the Clyde to Faslane on Gare Loch (1959 – 1962), ending the permanent RN presence at Rothesay. In early 1963, she moved to the 2nd Submarine Squadron at Devonport. In March 1966 she was listed for disposal. In September 1970 she arrived at Inverkeithing to be broken up.

Adamant was capable of servicing up to nine submarines at a time while accommodating their crews. Her on-board facilities included a foundry, light and heavy machine shops, electrical and torpedo repair shops, and equipment to support fitters, patternmakers, coppersmiths and shipwrights. After the war, the increased technical sophistication of submarines, and the concomitant increase in the number of technical staff required to service them, reduced her support capacity to six submarines at a time.

In 1963, all her original guns were removed and replaced by two quadruple and two twin Bofors 40 mm gun mounts. Her design included one-inch torpedo bulkhead 10 feet (3.0 m) inboard, and two-inch steel armour to protect her middle deck.
