= HMS Otway =

Submarine of the Royal Navy

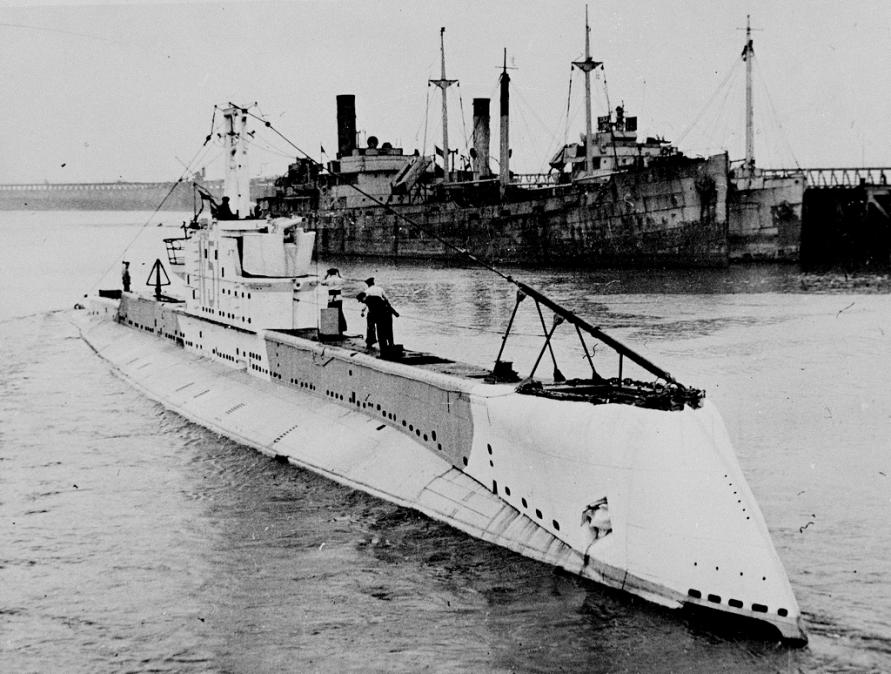
- HMS Otway

History

Australia
- Builder: Vickers-Armstrongs
- Laid down: March 1925
- Launched: 7 September 1926
- Commissioned: 15 June 1927
- Decommissioned: 10 May 1930
- Fate: Transferred to Royal Navy

History

United Kingdom
- Commissioned: 10 April 1931
- Decommissioned: 1945
- Fate: Scrapped in August 1945

General characteristics
- Class & type: Odin-class submarine
- Displacement: 1,350 long tons (1,370 t) (surfaced); 1,870 long tons (1,900 t) (submerged)
- Length: 275 ft (83.8 m) length overall
- Beam: 29 ft 7 in (9.02 m)
- Draught: 13 ft 3 in (4.04 m) mean
- Propulsion: Diesel motors for surface running and electricity generation, electric motors when submerged
- Speed: 15.5 knots (28.7 km/h; 17.8 mph) surfaced; 9 knots (17 km/h; 10 mph) submerged
- Complement: 54
- Armament: 1 x 4-inch (102 mm) gun, 8 x 21 inch (533 mm) torpedo tubes (6 bow tubes, 2 stern tubes), 2 x machine guns

HMS Otway (originally HMAS Otway) was an Odin-class submarine of the Royal Australian Navy (RAN) and Royal Navy (RN).

== Design and construction ==
The Odin-class submarines were built to a slightly modified design for Australian service. They were 275 feet (84 m) in length overall, with a beam of 29 feet 7 inches (9.02 m), and a mean draught of 13 feet 3 inches (4.04 m). The displacement was 1,350 tons when surfaced, and 1,870 tons when submerged. The boats had diesel motors for surface running and electricity generation, but when underwater, they ran off electric motors. They had two propeller shafts. The maximum speed was 15.5 knots (28.7 km/h; 17.8 mph) on the surface, and 9 knots (17 km/h; 10 mph) when dived. Otway had a boat's company of 54. Armament consisted of eight 21-inch (530 mm) torpedo tubes (six facing forward, two facing aft), one 4-inch (100 mm) deck gun, and two machine guns.

Otway was laid down by Vickers Limited of Barrow-in-Furness in England in March 1925, under the designation OA2. She was launched on 7 September 1926, and commissioned into the RAN on 15 June 1927.

== Operational history ==
After commissioning, Otway and Oxley were temporarily assigned to the Royal Navy's 5th Submarine Flotilla. On 8 February 1928, the two submarines set out for Australia in the longest unescorted voyage undertaken by a British submarine. En route to Malta, cracks were found in Otway's engine columns. On arrival in Malta, similar fractures were found in Oxley's engine columns, and the two boats were detained while improved columns were fabricated and installed. They resumed their voyage in November, and reached Sydney on 14 February 1929. Because of the deteriorating financial conditions leading into the Great Depression, the two submarines were placed into reserve a year later; Otway was paid off on 10 May 1930. The submarines were maintained in operational condition, and left the harbour twice a month for diving exercises.

The ongoing cost of maintaining the boats, coupled with the tonnage limits imposed by the London Naval Treaty prompted the Australian government to offer Otway and Oxley to the Royal Navy. The submarines were transferred and commissioned on 10 April 1931, and sailed to Britain.

HMS Otway operated during World War II with the pennant number 51. In 1942 it was under the command of Commander Howard Bone.

The submarine left RN service in 1945, and in August was transported to Thos. W. Ward Inverkeithing, Scotland to be broken up.
