= HMS Oberon (P21) =

Submarine of the Royal Navy

- HMS Oberon at sea, bow and stern images

History

United Kingdom
- Name: HMS Oberon
- Laid down: 22 March 1924
- Launched: 24 September 1926
- Commissioned: 24 August 1927
- Decommissioned: 5 July 1944
- Identification: Pennant number P21
- Fate: Scrapped 1945

General characteristics
- Class & type: Odin-class submarine
- Displacement: 1,311 long tons (1,332 t) surfaced; 1,892 long tons (1,922 t) submerged
- Length: 270 ft (82 m)
- Beam: 28 ft (8.5 m)
- Propulsion: Diesel-electric; 2 × diesel engines, 4,600 hp (3,400 kW); 2 × electric motors, 350 hp (260 kW); 2 screws
- Speed: 15.5 knots (17.8 mph; 28.7 km/h) surfaced; 9 kn (10 mph; 17 km/h) submerged
- Range: 8,400 nmi (15,600 km) at 10 kn (12 mph; 19 km/h) surfaced; 70 nmi (130 km) at 4 kn (4.6 mph; 7.4 km/h) submerged
- Test depth: 300 ft (91 m)
- Complement: 54
- Armament: 8 × 21 in (533 mm) torpedo tubes (6 bow, 2 stern) with 16 reloads; 1 × QF 4-inch (102 mm) Mk XII deck gun; 2 × Lewis machine guns

HMS Oberon was the prototype for the Odin-class submarine of the Royal Navy.

== Design ==
Oberon was the prototype for the Odin-class submarines and was initially named O1 but renamed in 1924, becoming the first named British submarine. Ordered under the 1923 programme, she was the fifth ship of the Royal Navy to carry the name Oberon. The submarine was built in response to the demise of the Anglo-Japanese Alliance in 1922, which necessitated a need for a long-range patrol submarine capable of operations in the Far East. Oberon differed from the predecessor L-class submarines in that she was lengthened by 32 feet (9.8 m) and broadened by 3 feet (0.91 m), in addition to a two-knot reduction in top speed, expanded range, and double the number of torpedoes and torpedo tubes.

With a complement of 54, Oberon was 270 feet (82 m) long overall with a beam of 28 feet (8.5 m) and a draught of 15.5 feet (4.7 m). She displaced 1,311 long tons (1,332 t) standard and 1,598 long tons (1,624 t) normal while surfaced, but displaced 1,831 long tons (1,860 t) normal while submerged. The submarine was propelled while surfaced by two Admiralty diesel engines rated at 2,950 brake horsepower (2,200 kW) and by two electric motors rated at 1,350 shaft horsepower (1,010 kW), each driving one propeller shaft. These gave her a maximum speed of 13.75 knots (25.47 km/h; 15.82 mph) surface and 7.5 knots (13.9 km/h; 8.6 mph) submerged – both short of a planned 15 knots (28 km/h; 17 mph) surfaced and 9 knots (17 km/h; 10 mph) submerged.

The submarine had a pressure hull with 3/4 inch (19 mm)-thick plating, to which saddle tanks were fitted, allowing for a maximum design depth of 500 feet (150 m), though Oberon was only tested to a depth of 200 feet (61 m). She was capable of carrying 186 long tons (189 t) of oil, mostly in leakage-prone external tanks riveted to the hull, which were replaced by welded tanks in a 1937 refit.

Initially armed with a single QF 4 inch/40 naval gun Mk IV (replaced with the Mk XII in the 1930s) for surface fighting, Oberon had eight 533-millimeter (21.0 in) torpedo tubes – six bow and two in the stern. The submarine could carry sixteen torpedoes, originally Mark IV but later replaced by Mark VIII. Oberon was the first submarine of the Royal Navy equipped with asdic while under construction, and was additionally equipped with Type 709 hydrophones and a Type SF direction finder. Modifications made during the Second World War included the addition of an Oerlikon 20 mm cannon for anti-aircraft defense and a Type 291W radio direction finder for air and surface warning.

== Construction and service ==
She was laid down on 22 March 1924, launched on 24 September 1926 at the Chatham Dockyard and commissioned on 24 August 1927. As a result of torsional vibration in her powerplant, the submarine was never deployed to the Far East. Oberon was stationed at Portsmouth between 1927 and 1931, then moved to the Mediterranean before returning to Portsmouth in 1934. On 11 October 1935, she collided with the destroyer Thanet at Devonport. Placed in reserve in 1937, Oberon was recommissioned on 2 August 1939 and was used for training during the Second World War. Lieutenant Michael Lindsay Coulton Crawford, previously commander of HMS Unseen in the Mediterranean, was given command on 24 March. She was decommissioned at Blyth on 5 July 1944 and was sold for scrap on 24 August 1945. Oberon was scrapped at Dunston by Clayton and Davie.

She was assigned a pennant number of 21.P, which was changed to 21.N in 1939 and to N.21 in 1940.
