= HMS Oxley =

Odin-class submarine of the Australian and British navies, in service from 1927 to 1931

Coordinates: 58°30′N 5°30′E

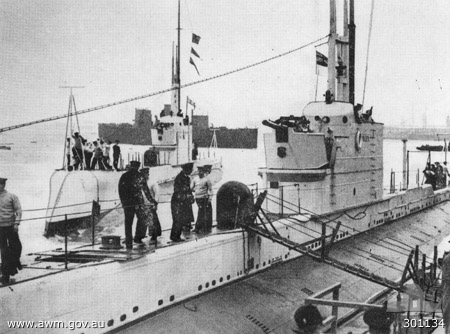
- HMAS Oxley (foreground) and Otway

History

Australia
- Name: HMAS Oxley
- Builder: Vickers-Armstrong Limited
- Laid down: March 1925
- Launched: 30 June 1926
- Completed: 22 July 1927
- Commissioned: 1 April 1927
- Decommissioned: 10 May 1930 (into reserve); 9 April 1931 (paid off in full)
- Motto: "Patience and Strength"
- Fate: Transferred to RN

United Kingdom
- Name: HMS Oxley
- Commissioned: 10 April 1931
- Fate: Torpedoed and sunk, 10 September 1939

General characteristics
- Class & type: Odin-class submarine
- Displacement: 1,350 long tons (1,372 t) (surfaced); 1,870 long tons (1,900 t) (submerged)
- Length: 275 ft (83.8 m) length overall
- Beam: 29 ft 7 in (9.02 m)
- Draught: 13 ft 3 in (4.04 m) mean
- Propulsion: Diesel motors for surface running and electricity generation, electric motors when submerged
- Speed: 15.5 knots (28.7 km/h; 17.8 mph) surfaced; 9 knots (17 km/h; 10 mph) submerged
- Complement: 54
- Armament: 1 x 4-inch (102 mm) gun; 8 x 21-inch (533 mm) torpedo tubes (6 bow tubes, 2 stern tubes); 2 x machine guns

HMS Oxley (originally HMAS Oxley) was an Odin-class submarine of the Royal Australian Navy (RAN) and later Royal Navy (RN). Very slightly off course, near Obrestad, on the south-western cape of Norway, she was sunk by friendly fire seven days after the start of World War II, costing 53 lives and leaving two survivors.

== Design and construction ==
The Odin-class submarines were built to a slightly modified design for Australian service. They were 275 feet (84 m) in length overall, with a beam of 29 feet 7 inches (9.02 m), and a mean draught of 13 feet 3 inches (4.04 m). Displacement was 1,350 tons when surfaced, and 1,870 tons when submerged. The boats had diesel motors for surface running and electricity generation, but when underwater ran off electric motors. They had two propeller shafts. The maximum speed was 15.5 knots (28.7 km/h; 17.8 mph) on the surface, and 9 knots (17 km/h; 10 mph) when submerged. Oxley had a ship's company of 54. Armament consisted of eight 21-inch (530 mm) torpedo tubes (six facing forward, two facing aft), one 4-inch (100 mm) deck gun, and two machine guns.

Oxley was laid down by Vickers-Armstrong Limited at Barrow-in-Furness, England in March 1925, under the designation OA1. She was launched on 29 June 1926, completed on 22 July 1927, and commissioned into the RAN on 1 April 1927. The submarine was named after explorer John Oxley.

== Operational history ==
After commissioning, Oxley and her sister boat Otway were temporarily assigned to the Royal Navy's 5th Submarine Flotilla. On 8 February 1928, the two submarines set out for Australia in the longest unescorted voyage undertaken by a British submarine. The submarines were diverted to Malta after cracks were found in Otway's engine columns. On arrival in Malta, similar fractures were found in Oxley's engine columns, and the two boats were detained while improved columns were fabricated and installed. They resumed their voyage in November, and reached Sydney on 14 February 1929. Because of the deteriorating financial conditions leading into the Great Depression, the two submarines were placed into reserve a year later; Oxley was paid off into Reserve on 10 May 1930. Oxley underwent diving exercises every second week until 9 April 1931, when the submarine was paid off in full prior to transfer to the RN.

The ongoing cost of maintaining the boats, coupled with the tonnage limits imposed by the London Naval Treaty prompted the Australian government to offer Oxley and Otway to the Royal Navy. The submarines were transferred and commissioned on 10 April 1931.

On 29 April, Oxley and Otway (which had also been recommissioned into the RN) left Sydney for Malta. At the onset of war, Oxley was a member of the 2nd Submarine Flotilla. From 26 to 29 August 1939, the 2nd Submarine Flotilla deployed to its war bases at Dundee and Blyth. Following the outbreak of the Second World War, Oxley was assigned to patrol duties off the coast of Norway. She was assigned the pennant number 55.

== Loss ==
On 10 September 1939, Oxley was sunk by HMS Triton in a friendly fire incident. Oxley was the first British submarine lost during the Second World War.

When the Admiralty was notified that the British Government would declare war on Germany, five submarines of the Second Flotilla, including HMS Triton and HMS Oxley, were ordered to patrol on the Obrestad line off Norway on 24 August 1939. Thus, on 3 September all British submarines were in their combat patrol sectors.

At 19:55 on 10 September 1939, Triton had surfaced, fixed a position off the Obrestad Light, set a slow zigzag patrol, and began charging batteries. Lieutenant Commander Steel, having verified that the area was clear and having posted lookouts, gave the bridge to the officer of the watch and went below, leaving orders that he was to be called if anything unusual appeared. At 20:45, he was called to the bridge when an object in the water could be seen very fine on the port bow.

Steel ordered propulsion shifted to the main motors, the signalman to the bridge, and torpedo tubes 7 and 8 readied for firing. The object was recognised as a submarine low in the water.

Once on the bridge, the signalman sent three challenges over several minutes with the box lamp, none of which were answered. Steel wondered if the boat could be HMS Oxley, which should have been patrolling next in line, but some distance away. Steel and his bridge crew studied the silhouette, but could not distinguish what type of submarine it was.

A fourth challenge was sent: three green rifle-grenade flares. After firing, Steel counted slowly to 15 and then decided that they were seeing a German U-boat. He ordered tubes 7 and 8 fired with a three-second interval. Less than a minute later, an explosion was heard.

Triton moved into the area to investigate and heard cries for help. The light from the Aldis lamp revealed three men floundering amid oil and debris.

Lieutenant Guy C. I. St.B. Watkins and Lieutenant Harry A. Stacey entered the water and rescued Lieutenant Commander H.G. Bowerman, Oxley's commanding officer, as well as Able Seaman Herbert Guckes, a lookout. The third person in the water, Lieutenant F.K. Manley, was seen to be swimming strongly when he suddenly sank from view. Neither Manley's body nor any other survivors from Oxley were found.

A Board of Enquiry found that Steel had done all he reasonably could in the circumstances. Oxley was out of position, Triton had acted correctly, and the first Allied submarine casualty of World War II was due to "friendly fire." During the war, the loss of Oxley was attributed to an accidental explosion. After the war, it was explained to have been a collision with Triton. The truth was not made public until the 1950s.

== Memorial ==
As Oxley was operating from Dundee (code/base name "HMS Ambrose") with the 2nd Submarine Flotilla when sunk, the 53 of her crew that died are all commemorated on the Dundee International Submarine Memorial. Two crewmen survived.
