= German submarine U-62 (1939) =

German World War II submarine

History

Nazi Germany
- Name: U-62
- Ordered: 21 July 1937
- Builder: Deutsche Werke AG, Kiel
- Yard number: 261
- Laid down: 2 January 1939
- Launched: 16 November 1939
- Commissioned: 21 December 1939
- Fate: Scuttled at Wilhelmshaven, 5 May 1945, wreck later scrapped

General characteristics
- Class & type: Type IIC coastal submarine
- Displacement: 291 t (286 long tons) surfaced; 341 t (336 long tons) submerged
- Length: 43.90 m (144 ft 0 in) o/a; 29.60 m (97 ft 1 in) pressure hull
- Beam: 4.08 m (13 ft 5 in) (o/a); 4.00 m (13 ft 1 in) (pressure hull)
- Height: 8.40 m (27 ft 7 in)
- Draught: 3.82 m (12 ft 6 in)
- Installed power: 700 PS (510 kW; 690 bhp) (diesels); 410 PS (300 kW; 400 shp) (electric)
- Propulsion: 2 shafts; 2 × diesel engines; 2 × electric motors
- Speed: 12 knots (22 km/h; 14 mph) surfaced; 7 knots (13 km/h; 8.1 mph) submerged
- Range: 1,900 nmi (3,500 km; 2,200 mi) at 12 knots (22 km/h; 14 mph) surfaced; 35–42 nmi (65–78 km; 40–48 mi) at 4 knots (7.4 km/h; 4.6 mph) submerged
- Test depth: 80 m (260 ft)
- Complement: 3 officers, 22 men
- Armament: 3 × 53.3 cm (21 in) torpedo tubes; 5 × torpedoes or up to 12 TMA or 18 TMB mines; 1 × 2 cm (0.79 in) C/30 anti-aircraft gun

Service record
- Part of: 5th U-boat Flotilla; 21 – 31 December 1939; 1st U-boat Flotilla; 1 January – 30 September 1940; 21st U-boat Flotilla; 1 October 1940 – 20 March 1945
- Identification codes: M 23 080
- Commanders: Oblt.z.S. / Kptlt. Hans-Bernhard Michaelowski; 21 December 1939 – 20 May 1941; Oblt.z.S. Ludwig Forster; 20 May 1941 - September 1941; Oblt.z.S. Max Wintermeyer; September – 4 November 1941; Kptlt. Waldemar Mehl; 5 – 19 November 1941; Oblt.z.S. / Kptlt. Horst Schünemann; 20 November 1941 – 13 April 1942; Oblt.z.S. Dietrich Epp; 14 April – 15 September 1942; Oblt.z.S. Adolf Schönberg; 16 September 1942 – 19 July 1943; Lt.z.S. / Oblt.z.S. Horst Slevogt; 20 July 1943 – 31 October 1944; Lt.z.S. Hans-Eckart Augustin; 1 November 1944 – 20 March 1945
- Operations: 5 patrols: 1st patrol: 13 February – 6 March 1940; 2nd patrol: 4 – 25 April 1940; 3rd patrol: 18 May – 3 June 1940; 4th patrol: 13 June – 5 July 1940; 5th patrol: 10 July – 2 August 1940
- Victories: 1 merchant ship sunk (4,581 GRT); 1 warship sunk (1,350 tons)

German submarine U-62 was a Type IIC, U-boat of Nazi Germany's Kriegsmarine that served in World War II built by Deutsche Werke AG, Kiel and commissioned on 21 December 1939.

U-62 was initially assigned to the 5th U-boat Flotilla during her training period, until 1 January 1940, when she was reassigned to the 1st flotilla for a front-line combat role.

U-62 carried out five war patrols, sinking one warship in May 1940 and one merchant ship in July.

The U-boat was scuttled in Wilhelmshaven on 5 May 1945.

== Design ==
German Type IIC submarines were enlarged versions of the original Type IIs. U-62 had a displacement of 291 tonnes (286 long tons) when at the surface and 341 tonnes (336 long tons) while submerged. Officially, the standard tonnage was 250 long tons (254 t), however. The U-boat had a total length of 43.90 m (144 ft 0 in), a pressure hull length of 29.60 m (97 ft 1 in), a beam of 4.08 m (13 ft 5 in), a height of 8.40 m (27 ft 7 in), and a draught of 3.82 m (12 ft 6 in). The submarine was powered by two MWM RS 127 S four-stroke, six-cylinder diesel engines of 700 metric horsepower (510 kW; 690 shp) for cruising, two Siemens-Schuckert PG VV 322/36 double-acting electric motors producing a total of 410 metric horsepower (300 kW; 400 shp) for use while submerged. She had two shafts and two 0.85 m (3 ft) propellers. The boat was capable of operating at depths of up to 80–150 metres (260–490 ft).

The submarine had a maximum surface speed of 12 knots (22 km/h; 14 mph) and a maximum submerged speed of 7 knots (13 km/h; 8.1 mph). When submerged, the boat could operate for 35–42 nautical miles (65–78 km; 40–48 mi) at 4 knots (7.4 km/h; 4.6 mph); when surfaced, she could travel 3,800 nautical miles (7,000 km; 4,400 mi) at 8 knots (15 km/h; 9.2 mph). U-62 was fitted with three 53.3 cm (21 in) torpedo tubes at the bow, five torpedoes or up to twelve Type A torpedo mines, and a 2 cm (0.79 in) anti-aircraft gun. The boat had a complement of 25.

== Operational career ==
=== First and second patrols ===
U-62's first patrol began with her departure from the German island of Helgoland on 13 February 1940. She crossed the North Sea to the Orkney and Shetland Islands, returning to in Wilhelmshaven on 6 March.

Her second sortie was also through the North Sea but stayed closer to Norway, beginning in Wilhelmshaven and ending in Kiel.

=== Third patrol ===
The boat was attacked by an unidentified submarine on 24 May 1940, but U-62 evaded the torpedoes. She went on to sink the destroyer HMS Grafton off the Kwinte Buoy northwest of Ostend in Belgium on 29 May. The British warship had been employed on Operation Dynamo, the evacuation of the British Expeditionary Force (BEF). As a result, many of the dead included soldiers.

=== Fourth and fifth patrols ===
Her fourth foray was through the gap between the Faroe and Shetland Islands as far as Northern Ireland, but finished in Bergen in Norway on 7 July 1940.

U-62's final patrol was marked by the sinking of the Pearlmoor 62 nautical miles (115 km; 71 mi) west of Malin Head, the most northerly point on the Irish mainland, on 19 July 1940. Disaster almost struck on the return leg to Bergen when she was attacked by the British submarine HMS Sealion on 29 July. She avoided the attack and entered Bergen with just 27 minutes of battery life remaining.

=== Training and Fate ===
U-62 was assigned to the 21st U-boat Flotilla as a training boat on 1 October, and was briefly commanded by Waldemar Mehl between 5 and 19 November 1941.

She was scuttled in Wilhelmshaven on 5 May 1945, shortly before the German surrender.

== Summary of raiding history ==
Date	Ship	Nationality	Tonnage (Note: Merchant ship tonnages are in gross register tons. Military vessels are listed by tons displacement.)	Fate
29 May 1940	HMS Grafton	Royal Navy	1,350	Sunk
19 July 1940	Pearlmoor	United Kingdom	4,581	Sunk

== Bibliography ==
- Busch, Rainer; Röll, Hans-Joachim (1999). Der U-Boot-Krieg, 1939-1945: Deutsche U-Boot-Verluste von September 1939 bis Mai 1945 [German U-boat losses from September 1939 to May 1945] (in German). Vol. IV. Hamburg, Berlin, Bonn: Mittler. ISBN 3-8132-0514-2.
- Gröner, Eric; Jung, Dieter; Maass, Martin (1991). German Warships 1815-1945: U-boats and Mine Warfare Vessels. Vol. 2. Translated by Thomas, Keith; Magowan, Rachel. London: Conway Maritime Press. ISBN 0-85177-593-4.
