= HMS Orpheus (N46) =

Submarine of the Royal Navy

- HMS Orpheus

History

United Kingdom
- Name: HMS Orpheus
- Builder: William Beardmore and Company (Clyde)
- Laid down: 14 April 1927
- Launched: 26 February 1929
- Commissioned: 23 September 1930
- Fate: Sunk, 27 June 1940
- Badge

General characteristics
- Class & type: Odin class submarine
- Displacement: 1,781 tons surfaced; 2,038 tons submerged
- Length: 283 ft 6 in (86.41 m)
- Beam: 30 ft (9.1 m)
- Draught: 16 ft 1 in (4.90 m)
- Propulsion: Diesel-electric; 2 × diesel engines, 4,600 hp; 2 × electric motors, 350 hp; 2 screws
- Speed: 17.5 kn (20.1 mph; 32.4 km/h) surfaced; 9 kn (10 mph; 17 km/h) submerged
- Range: 8,400 nmi (15,600 km) at 10 kn (12 mph; 19 km/h) surfaced; 70 nmi (130 km) at 4 kn (4.6 mph; 7.4 km/h) submerged
- Test depth: 300 ft (91 m)
- Complement: 53-55 officers and men
- Armament: 8 × 21 in (530 mm) torpedo tubes (6 bow, 2 stern) with 16 reloads; 1 × QF 4-inch (101.6 mm) Mk XII deck gun; 2 × Lewis machine guns

HMS Orpheus (N46) was an O-class submarine of the Royal Navy. She was laid down by William Beardmore and Company on the Clyde on 14 April 1927, launched on 26 February 1929 and commissioned on 23 September 1930.

== Loss ==
Orpheus was declared overdue on 27 June 1940.
