= HMS Oswald =

Submarine of the Royal Navy

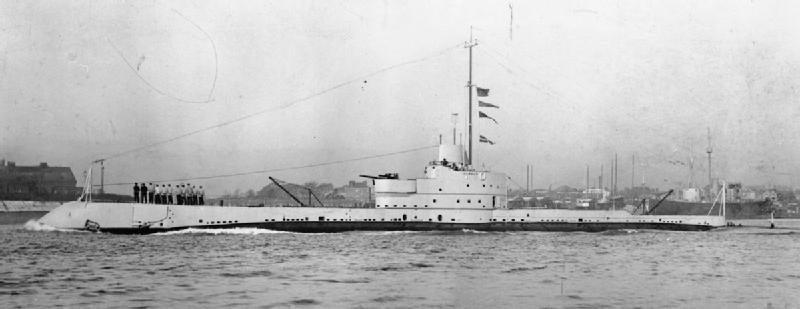
- Oswald before the Second World War

History

United Kingdom
- Name: HMS Oswald
- Ordered: 2 December 1926
- Builder: Vickers-Armstrongs, Barrow
- Laid down: 30 May 1927
- Launched: 19 June 1928
- Commissioned: 1 May 1929
- Identification: Pennant number: N58
- Fate: Sunk, 1 August 1940

General characteristics
- Class & type: Odin-class submarine
- Displacement: 1,781 long tons (1,810 t) (surfaced); 2,030 long tons (2,060 t) (submerged)
- Length: 283 ft 6 in (86.4 m)
- Beam: 30 ft (9.1 m)
- Draught: 16 ft 1 in (4.9 m)
- Installed power: 4,600 bhp (3,400 kW) (diesel); 350 hp (260 kW) (electric motor)
- Propulsion: Diesel-electric; 2 × Vickers diesel engines; 2 × electric motors; 2 screws
- Speed: 17.5 knots (32.4 km/h; 20.1 mph) (surfaced); 9 knots (17 km/h; 10 mph) (submerged)
- Range: 8,400 nmi (15,600 km; 9,700 mi) at 10 knots (19 km/h; 12 mph) (surfaced); 70 nmi (130 km; 81 mi) at 4 knots (7.4 km/h; 4.6 mph) (submerged)
- Test depth: 300 ft (91 m)
- Complement: 53–55 officers and ratings
- Armament: 8 × 21 in (533 mm) torpedo tubes (6 bow, 2 stern) with 16 reloads; 1 × QF 4-inch (102 mm) Mk XII deck gun; 2 × Lewis machine guns

HMS Oswald was an Odin-class submarine built for the Royal Navy during the 1920s.

== Construction ==
She was laid down by Vickers-Armstrongs at Barrow-in-Furness on 30 May 1927, launched on 19 June 1928 and commissioned on 1 May 1929.

== Loss ==
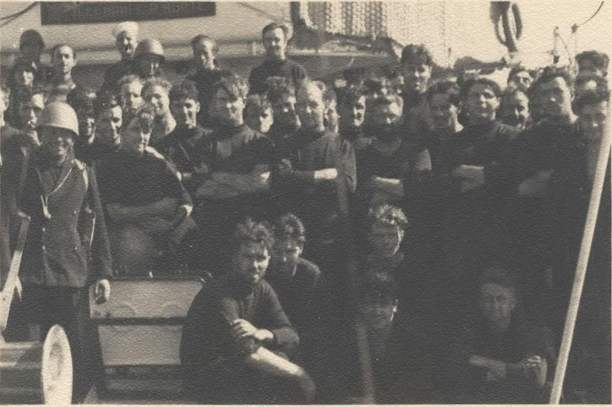
Oswald's survivors aboard Ugolino Vivaldi

Oswald left Alexandria, Egypt, for a patrol east of Sicily on 19 July 1940. On 30 July, she spotted a convoy of several merchant ships. Her attack on the convoy was not successful and she was spotted by the convoy's escorting destroyers. Subsequently, on 1 August Oswald was rammed and sunk by the Italian destroyer Ugolino Vivaldi while on patrol south of Calabria; 52 crewmen were rescued by Italian warships and 3 were lost.

== Bibliography ==
- Heden, Karl E. (2006). Sunken Ships, World War Two. Branden Books. ISBN 978-0-8283-2118-1.
- Lenton, H. T. (1972). British Submarines. Navies of the Second World War. London: MacDonald. ISBN 978-0-356-03612-0.
