= HMS Osiris (N67) =

Submarine of the Royal Navy

- HMS Osiris

History

United Kingdom
- Name: HMS Osiris
- Namesake: Osiris
- Ordered: 2 December 1926
- Builder: Vickers-Armstrongs (Barrow-in-Furness)
- Laid down: 12 May 1927
- Launched: 19 May 1928
- Commissioned: 25 January 1929
- Decommissioned: 7 March 1945
- Identification: Pennant number N67
- Fate: Scrapped at Durban, South Africa in 1946

General characteristics
- Class & type: Odin-class submarine
- Displacement: 1,781 tons surfaced; 2,038 tons submerged
- Length: 283 ft 6 in (86.41 m)
- Beam: 30 ft (9.1 m)
- Draught: 16 ft 1 in (4.90 m)
- Propulsion: Diesel-electric; 2 × diesel engines, 4,600 hp; 2 × electric motors, 350 hp; 2 screws
- Speed: 17.5 kn (20.1 mph; 32.4 km/h) surfaced; 9 kn (10 mph; 17 km/h) submerged
- Range: 8,400 nmi (15,600 km) at 10 kn (12 mph; 19 km/h) surfaced; 70 nmi (130 km) at 4 kn (4.6 mph; 7.4 km/h) submerged
- Test depth: 300 ft (91 m)
- Complement: 53–55 officers and men
- Armament: 8 × 21 in (530 mm) torpedo tubes (6 bow, 2 stern) with 16 reloads; 1 × QF 4-inch (101.6 mm) Mk XII gun on deck; 2 × Lewis machine guns

HMS Osiris was an O-class submarine of the Royal Navy. She was laid down by Vickers-Armstrongs of Barrow-in-Furness on 12 May 1927, launched on 19 May 1928 and commissioned on 25 Jan 1929.

She was first commissioned for service with the 4th Submarine Flotilla on the China Station.

== Wartime history ==
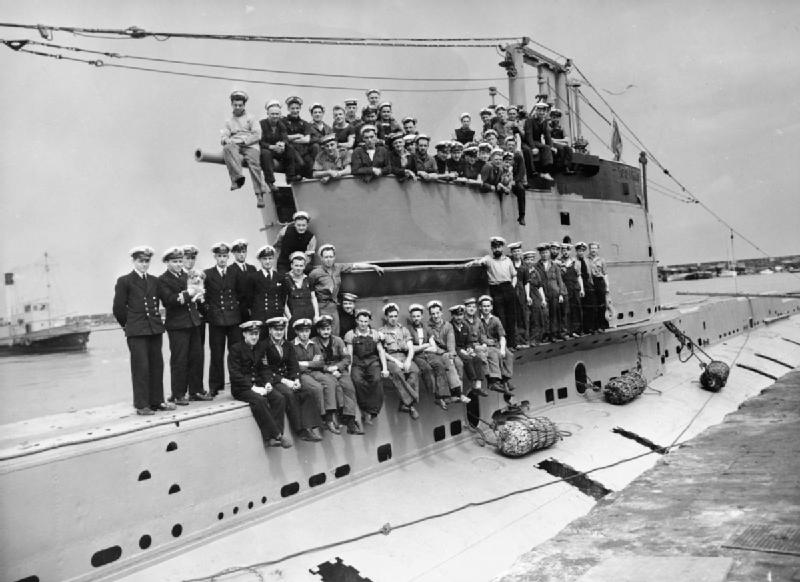
The crew of HMS Osiris

In September 1939, she was nominated for service on the East Indies Station and deployed with the 8th Flotilla at Colombo for flotilla duties. During January 1940 she transferred to the British Mediterranean Fleet and was deployed with the 1st Submarine Flotilla based at Alexandria.

On 16 August 1940, Osiris sank the Italian merchantman Morea (1,968 tons) approximately 50 nautical miles (93 km; 58 mi) west of Durazzo, Albania, with gunfire in a surface engagement, after Morea twice evaded torpedoes fired at the ship.

During an attack carried out on a convoy in the Otranto Strait on 22 September 1940 Osiris torpedoed and sank one of the convoy escorts, the Palestro (875 tons displacement), approximately 40 nautical miles (74 km; 46 mi) west of Durazzo, Albania (position 41°19'N, 18°34'E). On returning to Alexandria, Osiris received a package from the commanding officer of the flotilla with instructions "not to come alongside unless this identity signal is showing". The package contained a Jolly Roger which was duly hoisted. From that day onward the Captain (S) gave each submarine in his flotilla a Jolly Roger as soon as she had achieved a success on patrol.

On 14 July 1941 Osiris damaged the Italian merchant ship Capo d'Orso (3,149 tons) with gunfire in a surface engagement near Argostolion, Kefalonia, Greece.

In another surface engagement on 27 June 1943, Osiris sank the Italian sailing vessel Vittorina (11 tons) north of Crete (position 36°12'N, 26°45'E) with gunfire.

During the Allied invasion of Sicily from July to August 1943, she was deployed on interception patrol to prevent Italian warships interfering with the landings. From August 1943 she served with the Eastern Fleet training anti-submarine escorts before transferring to the new East Indies Fleet in November 1944.

She was decommissioned on 7 March 1945.

Osiris was sold to be broken up for scrap in September 1945. She was scrapped at Durban, South Africa.

== Bibliography ==
- Caruana, Joseph (2012). "Emergency Victualling of Malta During WWII". Warship International. LXIX (4): 357–364. ISSN 0043-0374.
