= HMS Sealion (72S) =

Submarine of the Royal Navy

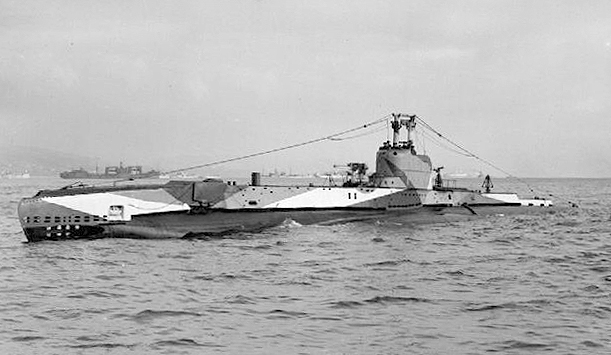
- Sealion on the surface

History

United Kingdom
- Name: Sealion
- Ordered: 23 December 1932
- Builder: Cammell Laird, Birkenhead
- Laid down: 16 May 1933
- Launched: 16 March 1934
- Completed: 21 December 1934
- Fate: Scuttled as ASDIC target, 13 March 1946, Firth of Clyde

General characteristics
- Class & type: S-class submarine
- Displacement: 768 long tons (780 t) surfaced; 960 long tons (980 t) submerged
- Length: 208 ft 8 in (63.6 m)
- Beam: 24 ft 0 in (7.3 m)
- Draught: 11 ft 10 in (3.6 m)
- Installed power: 1,550 bhp (1,160 kW) (diesel); 1,300 hp (970 kW) (electric)
- Propulsion: 2 × diesel engines; 2 × electric motors
- Speed: 13.75 knots (25.47 km/h; 15.82 mph) surfaced; 10 knots (19 km/h; 12 mph) submerged
- Range: 6,000 nmi (11,000 km; 6,900 mi) at 10 knots (19 km/h; 12 mph) surface; 64 nmi (119 km; 74 mi) at 2 knots (3.7 km/h; 2.3 mph) submerged
- Test depth: 300 feet (91 m)
- Complement: 40
- Armament: 6 × bow 21 in (533 mm) torpedo tubes; 1 × 3-inch (76 mm) deck gun

HMS Sealion was a second-batch S-class submarine built during the 1930s for the Royal Navy. Completed in 1934, the boat fought in the Second World War.

== Design and description ==
The second batch of S-class submarines were designed as slightly improved and enlarged versions of the earlier boats of the class and were intended to operate in the North and Baltic Seas. The submarines had a length of 208 feet 8 inches (63.6 m) overall, a beam of 24 feet 0 inches (7.3 m) and a mean draught of 11 feet 10 inches (3.6 m). They displaced 768 long tons (780 t) on the surface and 960 long tons (980 t) submerged. The S-class submarines had a crew of 40 officers and ratings. They had a diving depth of 300 feet (91 m).

For surface running, the boats were powered by two 775-brake-horsepower (578 kW) diesel engines, each driving one propeller shaft. When submerged each propeller was driven by a 650-horsepower (485 kW) electric motor. They could reach 13.75 knots (25.47 km/h; 15.82 mph) on the surface and 10 knots (19 km/h; 12 mph) underwater. On the surface, the second-batch boats had a range of 6,000 nautical miles (11,000 km; 6,900 mi) at 10 knots (19 km/h; 12 mph) and 64 nmi (119 km; 74 mi) at 2 knots (3.7 km/h; 2.3 mph) submerged.

The S-class boats were armed with six 21-inch (533 mm) torpedo tubes in the bow. They carried six reload torpedoes for a total of a dozen torpedoes. They were also armed with a 3-inch (76 mm) deck gun.

== Construction and career ==
Ordered on 23 December 1932, Sealion was laid down on 16 May 1933 in Cammell Laird's shipyard in Birkenhead and was launched on 16 March 1934. The boat was completed on 21 December.

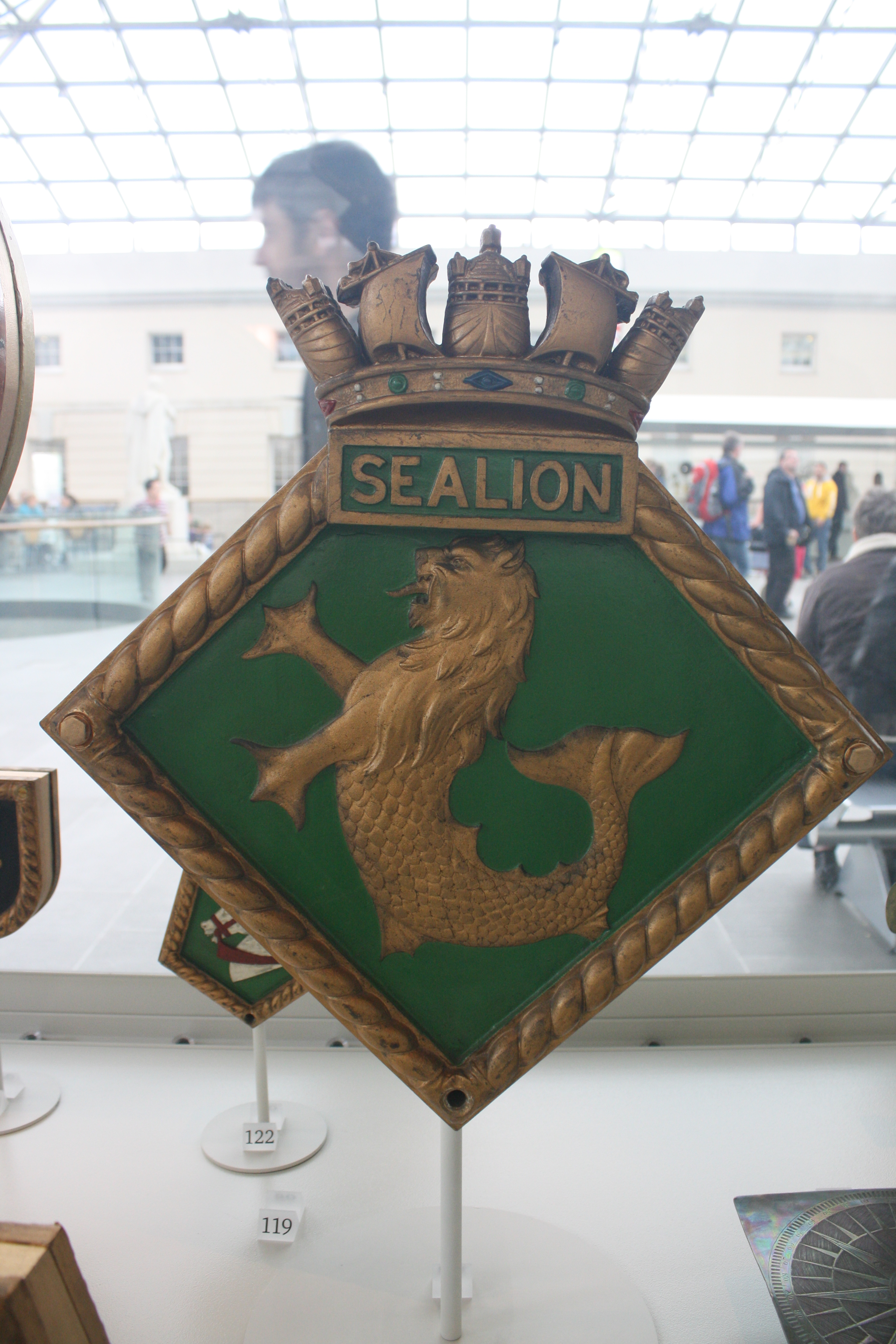
Ship's badge in the National Maritime Museum

She had an eventful career after the outbreak of war. Under the command of Lieutenant Commander (later Rear Admiral) Benjamin Bryant, she attacked the German submarine U-21 off the Dogger Bank in November 1939, but failed to sink her. Her first success was the German merchant August Leonhardt, sunk in April 1940 off the Danish island of Anholt. She later attacked the German merchant Moltkefels, but failed to hit her. She fired upon the beached Palime, and unsuccessfully attacked U-62 in July 1940. She finished her patrol by sinking the Norwegian merchant Toran and attacking but failing to sink the German merchant Cläre Hugo Stinnes in August.

On 5 February 1941 she shelled and sank the Norwegian Hurtigruten cargo-passenger ship Ryfylke. In May of that year Sealion unsuccessfully attacked U-74. In July she attacked French shipping, sinking the French fishing vessels Gustav Eugene and Gustav Jeanne, and on succeeding days, Christus Regnat and St Pierre d'Alcantara.

She was one of a number of submarines ordered to track the German battleship Bismarck before her eventual sinking.

Towards the end of 1941 she sank the Norwegian tanker Vesco and the Norwegian merchant Island.

She was scuttled as an ASDIC target off the Isle of Arran, Firth of Clyde, on 13 March 1946.
