= Odin-class submarine =

Type of British submarines in service after WWI and during WWII

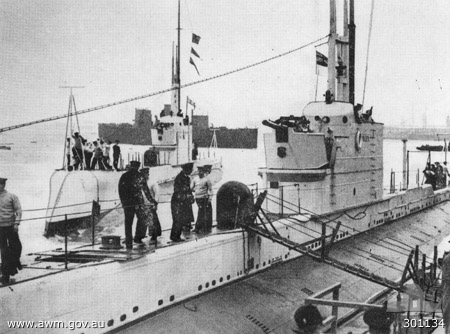
- Oxley and Otway

Class overview
- Name: Odin class or O class
- Operators: Royal Navy; Royal Australian Navy
- Preceded by: L class
- Succeeded by: Parthian class
- Subclasses: Capitan O'Brien class
- In commission: 22 July 1927–1945
- Completed: 9
- Lost: 5
- Retired: 4

General characteristics
- Type: Submarine
- Displacement: Group 1: 1,311 long tons (1,332 t) surfaced; 1,892 long tons (1,922 t) submerged; Group 2: 1,781 long tons (1,810 t) surfaced; 2,030 long tons (2,060 t) submerged
- Length: Group 1: 275 ft (83.8 m); Group 2: 283 ft 6 in (86.4 m)
- Beam: Group 1: 28 ft (8.5 m); Group 2: 30 ft (9.1 m)
- Propulsion: Diesel-electric; 2 × diesel engines, 4,600 hp (3,400 kW); 2 × electric motors, 350 hp (260 kW); 2 screws
- Speed: Group 1: 15.5 knots (28.7 km/h; 17.8 mph) surfaced; 9 knots (17 km/h; 10 mph) submerged; Group 2: 17.5 knots (32.4 km/h; 20.1 mph) surfaced; 9 knots (17 km/h; 10 mph) submerged
- Range: 8,400 nmi (15,600 km; 9,700 mi) at 10 knots (19 km/h; 12 mph) surfaced; 70 nmi (130 km; 81 mi) at 4 knots (7.4 km/h; 4.6 mph) submerged
- Test depth: 300 ft (91.4 m)
- Complement: 54
- Sensors & processing systems: ASDIC
- Armament: 8 × 21-inch (533 mm) torpedo tubes (6 bow, 2 stern) with 16 reloads; 1 × QF 4-inch (102 mm) Mk XII deck gun; 2 × Lewis machine guns

The Odin-class submarine (or "O class") was a class of nine submarines developed and built for the Royal Navy (RN) in the 1920s. The prototype, Oberon, was followed by two boats originally ordered for the Royal Australian Navy, but transferred to the RN in 1931 because of the poor economic situation in Australia, and six modified boats ordered for the RN. Three modified boats were built for the Chilean Navy as the Capitan O'Brien-class submarines in 1929.

== Design ==
The class was built to replace the ageing L-class submarines which did not have adequate endurance for use in the Pacific Ocean. The Odins were theoretically able to dive to 500 feet (150 m), though none were formally tested beyond 300 feet (91 m). Armament consisted of eight 21-inch (533 mm) torpedo tubes (6 bow, 2 stern) and one 4-inch (102 mm) gun. The boats were of a saddle tank type with fuel carried in riveted external tanks. These external tanks proved vulnerable to leaking after depth-charge damage, thus betraying the position of the submarine. These boats were the first British submarines fitted with Asdic and VLF radio which could be used at periscope depth.

== Boats ==
Construction data for prototype boat
Boat	Builder	Launched	Fate
Oberon (ex-O1)	Chatham Dockyard	24 September 1926	Scrapped, 1945

Construction data for Oxley-class submarines
Boat	Builder	Launched	Fate
Otway	Vickers, Barrow	7 September 1926	Scrapped, 1945
Oxley	Vickers, Barrow	29 September 1926	Sunk in a friendly fire incident by Triton near Norway, 10 September 1939

Construction data for Odin-class submarines
Boat	Builder	Launched	Fate
Odin	Chatham Dockyard	5 May 1928	Sunk by Italian destroyer Strale in the Gulf of Taranto, 14 June 1940
Olympus	William Beardmore and Company	11 December 1928	Mined off Malta, 8 May 1942
Orpheus	William Beardmore and Company	26 February 1929	Sunk by Italian destroyer Turbine in the Mediterranean, 19 June 1940
Osiris	Vickers, Barrow	19 May 1928	Scrapped, September 1946, Durban.
Oswald	Vickers, Barrow	19 June 1928	Sunk by Italian destroyer Ugolino Vivaldi off Calabria, 1 August 1940
Otus	Vickers, Barrow	31 August 1928	Scuttled, September 1946, off Durban.
