= HMS Otus (N92) =

Submarine of the Royal Navy

Coordinates: 29°52′21″S 31°05′39″E

- HMS Otus

History

United Kingdom
- Name: HMS Otus
- Ordered: 2 December 1926
- Builder: Vickers-Armstrongs (Barrow-in-Furness, U.K.)
- Laid down: 31 May 1927
- Launched: 31 August 1928
- Commissioned: 5 July 1929
- Decommissioned: March 1946
- Identification: Pennant number N92
- Fate: Scuttled near Durban, South Africa in 1946

General characteristics
- Class & type: Odin-class submarine
- Displacement: 1,781 tons surfaced; 2,038 tons submerged
- Length: 283 ft 6 in (86.41 m)
- Beam: 30 ft (9.1 m)
- Draught: 16 ft 1 in (4.90 m)
- Propulsion: Diesel-electric; 2 × diesel engines, 4,600 hp; 2 × electric motors, 350 hp; 2 screws
- Speed: 17.5 kn (20.1 mph; 32.4 km/h) surfaced; 9 kn (10 mph; 17 km/h) submerged
- Range: 8,400 nmi (15,600 km) at 10 kn (12 mph; 19 km/h) surfaced; 70 nmi (130 km) at 4 kn (4.6 mph; 7.4 km/h) submerged
- Test depth: 300 ft (91 m)
- Complement: 53-55 officers and men
- Armament: 8 × 21 in (530 mm) torpedo tubes (6 bow, 2 stern) with 16 reloads; 1 × QF 4-inch (101.6 mm) Mk XII deck gun; 2 × Lewis machine guns

HMS Otus was an O-class submarine of the Royal Navy. She was laid down by Vickers-Armstrongs of Barrow-in-Furness on 31 May 1927, launched on 31 August 1928 and commissioned on 5 July 1929.

== Service history ==
Otus was first commissioned for service with the 4th Submarine Flotilla on the China Station, and when the war broke out in 1939 she was deployed with the 1st Submarine Flotilla based at Alexandria with the Mediterranean Fleet. From July to December 1941 the submarine was based at Malta from where she carried out interception patrols with the 1st Flotilla.

During 1941 she carried out patrols off Azores in defence of HG convoys on passage to and from Gibraltar, and with Olympus for patrol of Oran to intercept Vichy Dunkerque reported to about to attempt passage to France during Operation Principal.

On 14 August 1941 she was involved in a friendly fire incident, when the submarine Talisman under the command of Lt.Cdr. M. Willmott, RN mistook her for an enemy submarine and fired several torpedoes at her, approximately 140 nautical miles (260 km; 160 mi) north-west of Alexandria (position 32°41'N, 27°35'E).

On 3 September 1941, under command of Lt. R.M. Favell, RN, Otus unsuccessfully fired a torpedo at an unidentified enemy armed merchant cruiser of 4000 tons, approximately 175 nautical miles (324 km; 201 mi) east of Valletta, Malta.

During 1943 she was transferred to Simonstown, South Africa for purposes of anti-submarine training.

During December 1944 she was nominated to be withdrawn from service. She was paid-off and transferred to Reserve status. During 1945 she was transferred to Durban, South Africa. Otus was scuttled off Durban in September 1946.

== Discovery of the wreck ==
The wreck was located during March 2013 approximately 8 kilometres (4.3 nmi) south-east of the Durban Harbour entrance, at an approximate depth of 100 m (330 ft).

== Bibliography ==
- Caruana, Joseph (2012). "Emergency Victualling of Malta During WWII". Warship International. LXIX (4): 357–364. ISSN 0043-0374.
