= HMS Odin (N84) =

Submarine of the Royal Navy

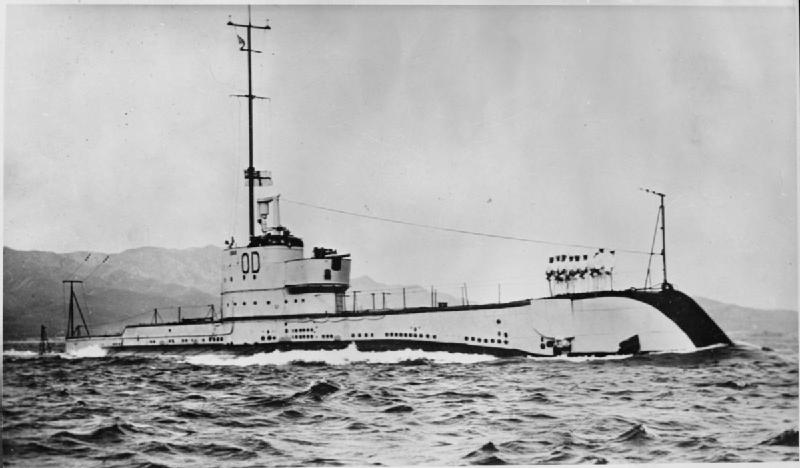
- Odin underway off Hong Kong

History

United Kingdom
- Name: HMS Odin
- Builder: Chatham Dockyard
- Laid down: 23 June 1927
- Launched: 5 May 1928
- Commissioned: 21 December 1929
- Fate: Sunk, 14 June 1940

General characteristics
- Class & type: Odin class submarine
- Displacement: 1,781 tons surfaced; 2,038 tons submerged
- Length: 283 ft 6 in (86.41 m)
- Beam: 30 ft (9.1 m)
- Draught: 16 ft 1 in (4.90 m)
- Propulsion: Diesel-electric; 2 × diesel engines, 4,600 hp; 2 × electric motors, 350 hp; 2 screws
- Speed: 17.5 kn (20.1 mph; 32.4 km/h) surfaced; 9 kn (10 mph; 17 km/h) submerged
- Range: 8,400 nmi (15,600 km) at 10 kn (12 mph; 19 km/h) surfaced; 70 nmi (130 km) at 4 kn (4.6 mph; 7.4 km/h) submerged
- Test depth: 300 ft (91 m)
- Complement: 53–55 officers and men
- Armament: 8 × 21 in (530 mm) torpedo tubes (6 bow, 2 stern) with 16 reloads; 1 × QF 4-inch (101.6 mm) Mk XII deck gun; 2 × Lewis machine guns

HMS Odin (N84) was an O-class submarine of the Royal Navy. She was laid down by HM Dockyard at Chatham in Kent on 23 June 1927, launched on 5 May 1928 and commissioned on 21 December 1929. The name Odin refers to the 74-gun, Danish man-of-war surrendered to the British in 1807.

She served with the 5th Flotilla at Portsmouth in 1929–1930, with the 4th Flotilla at Hong Kong from 1930 to 1939, with the 8th Flotilla at Colombo in Ceylon in 1939–1940, and with the 1st Flotilla at Alexandria in Egypt in 1940. Odin was sent to Malta shortly before Italy declared war on 10 June.

Odin was depth charged and sunk in the Gulf of Taranto, most probably by the Italian destroyers Strale and Baleno on 14 June 1940. The entire crew was lost.
