= HMS Titania =

1915 submarine depot ship

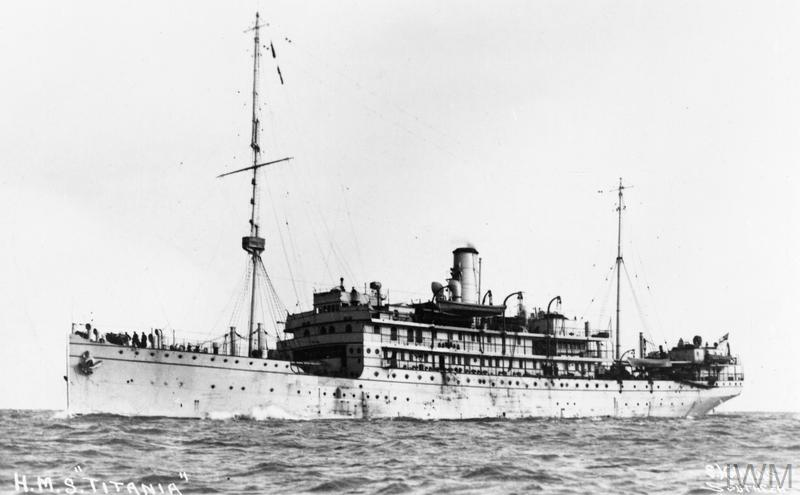
- Titania before 1920

History

United Kingdom
- Name: HMS Titania
- Builder: Clyde Shipbuilding Co, Port Glasgow
- Launched: March 1915
- Commissioned: November 1915
- Fate: Scrapped in 1948/1949 at Faslane

General characteristics
- Displacement: 5,250 long tons (5,330 t)
- Length: 335 ft (102.1 m)
- Beam: 46 ft 3 in (14.1 m)
- Draught: 18 ft 3 in (5.6 m)
- Speed: 14.5 knots (26.9 km/h; 16.7 mph)
- Complement: 249

HMS Titania (pennant number F32) was a Royal Navy submarine depot ship. Most of those that saw service in the First World War were scrapped in the 1930s. Titania, however, saw service in the Second World War. She was scrapped at Faslane, Scotland, in September 1949.

== History ==
=== Construction ===
Titania was built in Port Glasgow, Scotland, by the Clyde Shipbuilding Co. (Port Glasgow, Scotland) originally as a merchant ship ordered by Royal Hungarian Sea Navigation Company "Adria" as Károly Ferencz József. She was launched in March 1915 and commissioned by the Royal Navy as a submarine depot ship in November 1915.

=== 1915–1919: 11th Submarine Flotilla, Blyth ===
When she was first commissioned, in November 1915, she was stationed at Blyth and under the command of Captain Stanley L. Willis. In December 1915, the Eleventh Flotilla became the first directly supporting the submarines of the Grand Fleet. The flotilla was formed at first from submarines D7 and D8 taken from the Eighth Flotilla and HMS Titania as their depot ship. During the period in which Titania was the depot ship of the 11th Submarine Flotilla, other ships shared the role at various times, including HMS Mastiff, HMS Talisman, HMS Trident, HMS Tartar and HMS Moon. Other submarines of the G and J classes joined the flotilla and the D-class submarines were removed.

On 3 June 1916, following the Battle of Jutland, HMS Titania instructed submarine G10 to locate and sink floating remains of the battlecruiser HMS Invincible which had been abandoned during the battle to prevent the capture of materials. No remains were found.

On 28 October 1918, Captain Frederick Avenel Sommerville was put in command of HMS Titania and made Commander (S) of the 11th Submarine Flotilla based at Blyth. The Eleventh Flotilla was disbanded in March 1919.

=== 1919–1929: 4th Submarine Flotilla, China ===
==== Establishment of the 4th Flotilla ====
On 1 October 1919, HMS Titania and HMS Ambrose were the two ships commissioned at Chatham as depot ships for the 4th Submarine Flotilla, China. At that time, another depot ship was already in service at Hong Kong, HMS Rosario. Rosario had been converted to a depot ship in 1910 and was serving in Hong Kong as the depot ship for the Hong Kong Submarine Flotilla, which consisted of three C-class submarines, C36, C37 and C38. These three submarines were built by Vickers, Barrow, commissioned on 1 February 1910 and sailed with HMS Rosario to Hong Kong in February 1911. They were all sold in Hong Kong on 25 June 1919. HMS Rosario was sold for scrap in Hong Kong on 11 December 1921.

==== Submarines of the 4th Flotilla ====
The submarines of the 4th Flotilla that accompanied HMS Titania and HMS Ambrose were all of the L class.

Seven submarines accompanied HMS Titania on the voyage to Hong Kong. Submarines mentioned in the Ship's Log are L2, L5, L6, L8, L19, L20 and L33. HMS L9 sank in Hong Kong harbour on 18 August 1923 during a typhoon. She was raised, refitted and put back into service. She was sold in Hong Kong on 30 June 1927, the first L-class boat to be sold.

==== Voyage to Hong Kong ====
HMS Ambrose, under the command of Cecil Ponsonby Talbot, left Devonport in October 1919 and sailed with six L-class submarines of the 4th Submarine Flotilla (L1, L3, L4, L7, L9 and L15) to Hong Kong, where she remained until 28 March 1928. The exact timing of Ambrose's voyage to Hong Kong is not known. It appears that her arrival in Hong Kong was in January 1920.

After commissioning HMS Titania sailed to Malta. The Ship's Log shows that she left Chatham on 9 October 1919 and sailed via Sheerness to Portsmouth, arriving there on 14 October 1919. On 29 October she set sail for Malta, sailing via Gibraltar, where she stayed from 3 to 8 November 1919, arriving in Malta on 12 November.

On 18 February 1920 she and the remaining part of the 4th Submarine Flotilla, consisting of seven L-class submarines (L2, L5, L6, L8, L19, L20 and L33), under the command of Captain Frederick A. Sommerville, set sail for Hong Kong via Port Said, Suez, Ismailia, Aden, Colombo, Penang and Singapore. She arrived in Hong Kong on 14 April 1920. The ship's log records that HMS Titania weighed anchor and secured to Storm Signal Buoy at 10.17 a.m. on 14 April 1920. Gap Rock Light referred to in the Log is in the Wanshan Archipelago, to the south of Hong Kong Island. The reference to Waglan Light shows that she entered Hong Kong Harbour from the east through Tathong Channel and passed by the fishing village of Lye Mun (Lei Yue Mun) in Kowloon before docking. The exact location of Storm Signal Buoy is uncertain. It is likely to have been in the Admiralty area of Hong Kong Island, at the shore station HMS Tamar .

==== In Hong Kong ====
Titania fielded a football team in the Hong Kong Second Division League and the team won the championship in the 1921/22 and 1923/24 seasons.

==== Service in Hong Kong ====
In her service life she made a number of voyages in the Far East. Between 1920 and 1926 she sailed several times on voyages from Hong Kong to destinations around the Far East.

She was recommissioned at Hong Kong in 1921, 9 February 1924 and 5 November 1926.

The Ship's Log for the period 1919 to 1924 shows that Titania was based at Hong Kong on many occasions. When away from Hong Kong the destinations were mostly along the Chinese coast, Shanghai, Wei Hai Wei, Tsingtau, and other destinations round the South China Sea and Malaya.

- 15 April 1920 to 24 June 1920 – stationed in Hong Kong

==== Return to Britain ====
At the end of her service in Hong Kong, she returned to the UK via Malta. HMS Ambrose had already left Hong Kong on 28 March 1928 and returned to England.

A report in the Singapore Free Press and Mercantile Advertiser on 27 July 1929 notes that HMS Medway is undergoing trials.

NEW SUBMARINE DEPOT SHIP. "A Floating Base." The trials have now been begun of H.M.S. Medway, which has been built by Vickers Armstrongs, Limited, at their Barrow works to fulfil an urgent need for a larger and better-equipped submarine depot and repair ship. The Medway will take the place of the Maidstone, built in 1912 and employed throughout the late War as parent ship of the flotilla working from Harwich. In her design and equipment there have been introduced many novel features as a result of experience gained during and since the War. Her resources and accommodation are such as to make her probably the most spacious and efficient vessel of her kind in any navy, and it is no exaggeration to call her a floating submarine base.

A report in the Straits Times on 3 October 1929 mentions HMS Titania and HMS Marazion (1919). It appears that Marazion was serving with the 4th Flotilla, filling the void left by the departure of HMS Ambrose. Note: submarines L23 and L27, mentioned in the article, were not present when Ambrose and Titania sailed to Hong Kong in 1920. It is not known when they arrived in Hong Kong.

CHINA SQUADRON

SHIPPING NOTES. Ships Beginning to Return to Hong Kong. H.M. Ships on the China station, which have been spending the summer at Weihaiwei and other Northern ports, are returning to Hong Kong, their winter headquarters. H.M.S. Bruce, the leader of the 8th Destroyer Flotilla, arrived on Sept. 26 and is now at the Dockyard, north arm. H.M.S. Sterling, another of the units is also at the north arm. H.M.S. Seraph and H.M.S. Serapis are in the basin. H.M.S. Sepoy, Somme, Sirdar and Thracian were due on Sept. 26. The eighth unit, H.M.S. Stormcloud is out on an exercise cruise.

The submarines of the 4th flotilla with H.M.S. Titania (depot ship) and H.M.S. Marazion (tender) were also due on Sept. 25 and include the L3, L15, L23 and L27. The cruiser H.M.S. Berwick is at the No. 1 buoy, Naval anchorage.

A newspaper report in the Straits Times on 11 February 1930 notes the arrival of Titania back in England. It read as follows:

SUBMARINES FROM CHINA

H.M.S. Titania, Commander A. B. Lockhart, D.S.C., which on her arrival home from China with submarines of the Fourth Flotilla, was ordered to relieve H.M.S. Vulcan, depot ship of the Sixth Flotilla, Portland.

She will retain her seagoing status. Of the six submarines returning with her, one will be retained in full commission to relieve H34 in the Fifth Flotilla. Submarine L3, completed in 1918, will be scrapped. The remaining four submarines will be reduced to reserve at Fort Blockhouse.

The submarines that sailed to Hong Kong in 1920 were L1 to L9, L15, L19, L20, and L33, a total of 13 submarines. L9 was sold for scrap in Hong Kong. HMS Ambrose returned to England with L1, L2, L4, L5, L7 and L8. HMS Titania returned to England with six submarines, four of them from those that sailed with her in 1920 and two more, L23 and L27. The six that sailed in 1920 were L3, L6, L15, L19, L20 and L33. It is not clear which ones did not return to England with Titania.

=== 1930–1940: 6th Submarine Flotilla, Portland/Blyth ===
On 1 October 1930 she was commissioned at Chatham for the 6th Submarine Flotilla based at Weymouth/Portland.

In 1935 she was temporarily with the 3rd Flotilla, Atlantic Fleet.

On 16 July 1935 she was the Flagship of the Flag Officer Commanding Submarines at the Silver Jubilee Review at Spithead.

In 1936 she was attached to the 6th Flotilla, Portland.

On 20 May 1937 she took part in the Coronation Review at Spithead as the Flag Officer Submarines' Flagship.

In 1939 she was based at Blyth with the 6th Flotilla.

=== 1940–1945: Holy Loch ===
In 1940 HMS Titania was refitted on the Tyne and transferred to Holy Loch for the remainder of the war.

She was adopted by the people of Dorking, Surrey during the March 1942 Warship Week.

On 6 May 1942, HMS H28 (Lt. R. E. Boddington), HMS H32 (Lt. J. Whitton, RN), and HMS P614 (Lt. Denis John Beckley conducted practice attacks on a convoy made up of the submarine tenders HMS Cyclops (F31) (Capt. Roderick Latimer Mackenzie Edwards)) HMS Titania (Cdr. Harold Robson Conway) and their escort HMS Breda (Capt. (Retd.) A. E. Johnston), HMS La Capricieuse (Lt. Cdr. George William Dobson, RNR) and HMS Boarhound (formerly HMS Terje 2 (FY315), renamed on 19 January 1941; Skr. Sidney George Jinks, RNR).

In 1943 she served as a depot ship in sea trials of the Welman mini-submarine.

=== 1945–1949: 5th Submarine Flotilla, Portsmouth ===
In 1945 she was transferred to Portsmouth Naval Base to serve as a depot hulk for the 5th Flotilla.

=== Disposal ===
In June 1949 she was broken up at Faslane.

== Personnel ==
=== Officers ===
- Cdr. Bill King spent a few months on HMS Titania in 1936 before he took command of the submarine HMS Snapper.

== See also ==
- Submarine tender
