= HMS Ambrose (1914) =

Steamship

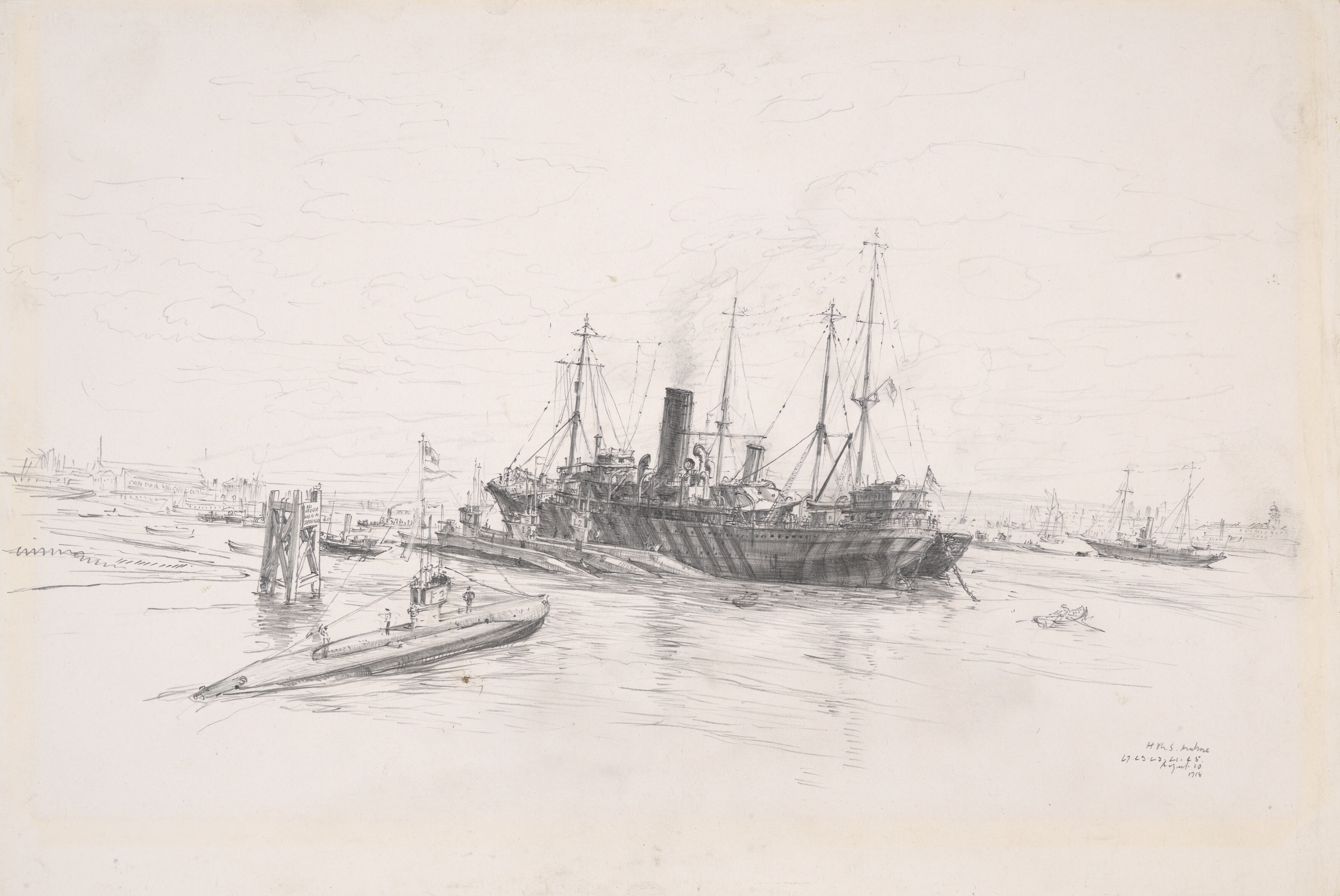
- Drawing of HMS Ambrose in dazzle camouflage, at anchor in harbour and surrounded by submarines

History
- Name: 1903: Ambrose; 1938: Cochrane
- Namesake: 1903: Ambrose; 1938: Thomas Cochrane
- Owner: 1903: Booth Steam Ship Co; 1915: British Admiralty
- Operator: 1903: Booth Steam Ship Co; 1915: (United Kingdom) Royal Navy
- Port of registry: (United Kingdom) Liverpool
- Route: Liverpool – Brazil
- Builder: Sir Raylton Dixon, Middlesbrough
- Cost: £89,000
- Yard number: 496
- Launched: 31 March 1903
- Completed: September 1903
- Acquired: by Admiralty, 20 October 1915
- Maiden voyage: 20 September 1903
- Identification: UK official number 118405; Code letters VFSJ; Call sign MDR; Pennant number M 87 (1915)
- Fate: Scrapped 1946

General characteristics
- Type: 1903: ocean liner; 1915: armed merchant cruiser; 1917: submarine depot ship; 1938: destroyer depot ship
- Tonnage: 1903: 4,187 GRT, 2,128 NRT 1907: 4,588 GRT, 2,490 NRT
- Displacement: 6,600 tons
- Length: 375.2 ft (114.4 m) registered; 387 ft 5 in (118.1 m) overall
- Beam: 47.8 ft (14.6 m)
- Draught: 20 ft 9 in (6.3 m)
- Depth: 26.4 ft (8.0 m)
- Installed power: 775 nhp; 6,350 ihp (4,740 kW)
- Propulsion: 1 × triple-expansion engine; 1 × screw
- Speed: 14.5 knots (27 km/h)
- Capacity: 1903: 149 first class, 330 steerage
- Crew: 1906: 102; 1917: 238
- Armament: as AMC: 8 × 4.7 inch guns, 2 × 6-pounder guns; as depot ship: 2 × 12-pdr AA guns

HMS Ambrose was a steamship that was built in 1903 as a passenger liner. The Booth Steam Ship Company ran her scheduled on services between Liverpool and Brazil until the First World War.

Ambrose was converted into a Royal Navy armed merchant cruiser (AMC) in 1914–15 and then into a submarine depot ship in 1917. After the First World War she supported Royal Navy submarines in the Far East from 1919 until 1928, when she was laid up in the Reserve Fleet.

In 1938 Ambrose was renamed HMS Cochrane and converted into a destroyer depot ship. Cochrane survived the Second World War and was scrapped in 1946.

== Building ==
Sir Raylton Dixon and Company of Middlesbrough built Ambrose for £89,000. She was launched on 31 March 1903 and completed that September. Her registered length was 375.2 ft (114.4 m) and she was 387 ft 5 in (118.1 m) long overall. Her beam was 47.8 ft (14.6 m), her holds were 26.4 ft (8.0 m) deep and her draught was 20 ft 9 in (6.3 m). As built, her tonnages were 4,187 GRT and 2,128 NRT.

Ambrose had one screw. The North Eastern Marine Engineering Company built her three-cylinder triple-expansion steam engine. The engine was variously rated as 775 nhp, 800 nhp or 6,350 ihp (4,740 kW). It gave her a speed of 14.5 knots (27 km/h).

Ambrose was registered at Liverpool. Her UK official number was 118405 and her code letters were VFSJ.

== Civilian service ==
Booth's operated scheduled cargo liner and passenger services between Europe and Brazil. In the first decade of the 20th century these services included regular sailings between Liverpool and Manaus, 1,000 miles (1,600 km) up the Amazon River. A Booth passenger ship would leave Liverpool for Manaus on or about the 10th, 20th and 30th day of each month. Ambrose's maiden voyage from Liverpool to Manaus began on either 20 September or 7 October 1903.

In 1906 Ambrose ran aground in Brazil. She had sailed from Liverpool on 30 August, called at Leixões in Portugal, and on 26 September reached Manaus. At 1000 hrs on 3 October she left Manaus on her return journey. At 1515 hrs she reached Para na' Trinidade, some miles downriver on the Amazon, where she ran aground and suffered damage. Ambrose remained at Para na' Trinidade for a week, and reached Liverpool on 27 October.

Booth Line took Ambrose's need for repair as an opportunity to increase her passenger capacity. On 28 October she left Liverpool for Hebburn on the River Tyne, where R&W Hawthorn, Leslie and Company repaired her hull, lengthened her poop deck and added berths for another 150 passengers. The alterations increased Ambrose's tonnages to 4,588 GRT and 2,490 NRT. Work was completed on 30 March 1907 and cost £17,000.

By 1914 Ambrose was equipped for wireless telegraphy, operated by the Marconi Company. Her call sign was MDR.

== Armed merchant cruiser ==
On 20 November 1914 the British Admiralty requisitioned Ambrose for conversion into an AMC. She was armed with eight 4.7 inch guns and two 6-pounder guns, and commissioned on 10 December 1914 as HMS Ambrose by Commander Charles William Bruton, R.N., with the pennant number M 87.

Ambrose served in the 10th Cruiser Squadron as part of the Allied Blockade of Germany. She patrolled between the British Isles, Iceland and Norway.

On 11 March off the west coast of Scotland a submarine attacked Ambrose three times. The first attack was at 1320 hrs, when a torpedo missed her bow by 20 yards (18 m). The second attack was at 1405 hrs, when a torpedo passed astern of her. The third attack was at 1422 hrs. On each occasion Ambrose opened fire on the periscope. After the third encounter the attacks ceased, and Ambrose's officers suspected that she had sunk the submarine.

On 6 May submarines attacked Ambrose off Skerryvore.

Ambrose's patrols with the 10th Cruiser Squadron ended in September 1915, when she reached port in Glasgow. On 13 October she transferred to Greenock and on 20 October her crew was paid off. Also on 20 October, the Admiralty bought Ambrose from Booth Line.

== Submarine depot ship ==
In 1917 Ambrose was converted into a submarine depot ship. In this rôle her complement was 238 officers and enlisted men. She was stationed at Berehaven, Ireland in January 1918 and transferred to Falmouth, Cornwall in November. In 1919 she was stationed at Devonport. From 19 September 1918 until 30 October 1920 her commander was Commander Cecil Talbot.

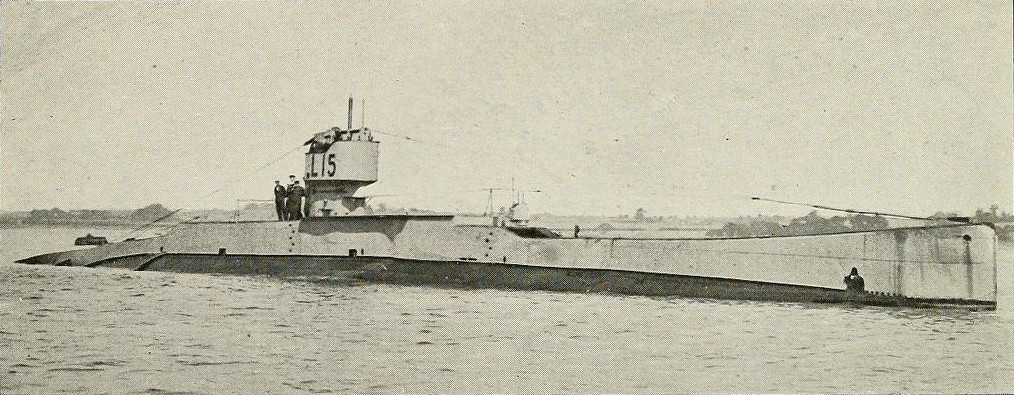
HMS L15 in 1918

On 1 October 1919 Ambrose and HMS Titania were sent to support the Fourth Submarine Flotilla in Hong Kong, replacing HMS Rosario. Six L-class submarines accompanied Ambrose: HMS L1, L3, L4, L7, L9 and L15. Ambrose and her submarines reached Hong Kong in January 1920.

Ambrose spent long periods at the Royal Navy bases in Hong Kong and Weihaiwei. She also visited Kobe and Shanghai in 1920, Nagasaki and Kobe in 1921 and Singapore in 1923.

In 1928 Ambrose and six L-class submarines were recalled to Britain. On this trip the six submarines were HMS L1, L2, L4, L5, L7 and L8. They left Hong Kong on 28 March, reached Singapore on 3 April and left Singapore on 8 April. On 4 December Ambrose was paid off into the Maintenance Reserve at Rosyth.

== Final years ==
On 1 June 1938 Ambrose was renamed HMS Cochrane. Some sources say that she was converted into a destroyer depot ship. Another source describes her Second World War rôle as a "base ship". In 1940, her Bomb Disposal Officer was responsible for the defusing and removal of a German shell that hit HMS Prince of Wales but did not explode during her fight with the battleship Bismarck in 1940.

In 1946 Cochrane was decommissioned and that November she was scrapped by ship breakers Thos. W. Ward at Inverkeithing.

== Bibliography ==
- Colledge, J. J.; Warlow, Ben (2006) [1969]. Ships of the Royal Navy: The Complete Record of All Fighting Ships of the Royal Navy from the 15th Century to the Present (3rd Rev ed.). London: Chatham Publishing. ISBN 978-1-86176-281-8. OCLC 67375475.
- John, AH (1959). A Liverpool Merchant House. London: George Allen & Unwin Ltd.
- Joyce, AH (Winter 1987). "Ambrose's Unique Conversion". Warships Supplement. 91. Kendal: World Ship Society: 18. ISSN 0043-0374.
- Lenton, HT (1998). British & Empire Warships of the Second World War. Annapolis, MD: Naval Institute Press. ISBN 1-55750-048-7.
- The Marconi Press Agency Ltd (1914). The Year Book of Wireless Telegraphy and Telephony. London: The Marconi Press Agency Ltd.
- Osborne, Richard; Spong, Harry & Grover, Tom (2007). Armed Merchant Cruisers 1878–1945. Windsor: World Warship Society. ISBN 978-0-9543310-8-5.
