= HMS L33 =

- L33 underway c. 1920

History

United Kingdom
- Name: L33
- Builder: Swan Hunter, Wallsend
- Laid down: 26 September 1917
- Launched: 29 May 1919
- Completed: 22 December 1919
- Fate: Sold for scrapping, 1932

General characteristics
- Class & type: L class submarine
- Displacement: 890 long tons (904 t) surfaced; 1,080 long tons (1,097 t) submerged
- Length: 228 ft (69 m)
- Beam: 23 ft 6 in (7.16 m)
- Speed: 17 knots (31 km/h; 20 mph) surfaced; 10.5 knots (19.4 km/h; 12.1 mph) submerged
- Range: 2,800 nmi (5,200 km) at 10 kn (19 km/h; 12 mph) surfaced
- Complement: 38
- Armament: 4 × 21 in (533 mm) bow torpedo tubes; 2 × 18 in (457 mm) beam torpedo tubes; 8 × 21 inch and 2 × 18 inch torpedoes; 1 × 4-inch gun

HMS L33 was a British L-class submarine built by Swan Hunter, Wallsend, laid down in September 1917, launched in May 1919, and completed in December 1920. She was armed with six torpedo tubes, and had a top speed of 17 knots (31 km/h; 20 mph) while surfaced. She had an uneventful career that included a deployment to the China Station in 1928. Obsolescent by the early 1930s, L33 was sold in February 1932 and broken up.

== Description ==
L33 was 238 feet 7 inches (72.72 m) long overall and she had a beam of 23 ft 5.5 in (7.150 m) and a draught of 13 ft 3 in (4.04 m) at normal loading. She displaced 890 long tons (900 t) surfaced and 1,080 long tons (1,100 t) submerged. Her propulsion system consisted of two diesel engines for use while surfaced and two corresponding electric motors for use submerged. The diesel engines were rated at 2,400 horsepower (1,800 kW), while the electric motors produced 1,600 hp (1,200 kW). She could cruise at 17 knots (31 km/h; 20 mph) while surfaced and 10.5 kn (19.4 km/h; 12.1 mph) while submerged. While running on the surface at 10 kn (19 km/h; 12 mph), the ship could cruise for a range of 3,800 nautical miles (7,000 km; 4,400 mi).

L33 was armed with a primary armament of four 21-inch (530 mm) torpedo tubes in the bow. These were supplied with eight torpedoes in total. Two additional, 18-inch (460 mm) tubes were located on the broadside, with a single torpedo apiece. She was also equipped with a 4-inch (100 mm) deck gun for use whilst surfaced. The gun was mounted on a revolving platform on the bridge level to increase its range and permit it to engage surfaced enemy submarines beyond torpedo range and in heavier seas. She had a crew of thirty-eight.

== Service history ==
L33 was built at the Swan Hunter shipyard; she was laid down on 26 September 1917, and she was launched on 29 May 1919. Fitting-out was completed on 22 December 1919. After construction was completed, she underwent sea trials on the Tyne, which included both submerged and surface trials. On 16 March 1926, L33 collided with another unknown vessel, though there were no injuries in the incident.

In 1928, L33 was assigned to the China Station, along with her sister ships L15, L19, and L27. By the 1930s, the L-class submarines had become obsolescent, and so most of them were removed from the Royal Navy's inventory. Accordingly, L33 was sold for scrapping in February 1932 and subsequently broken up.
