= George Simpson (Royal Navy officer) =

Royal Navy Rear Admiral (1901–1972)

Rear-Admiral George Simpson CB CBE
- Born: 6 June 1901; Dorking, Surrey, England
- Died: 2 March 1972 (aged 70); Whangārei, New Zealand
- Military career
- Allegiance: United Kingdom
- Branch: Royal Navy
- Service years: 1917–1954
- Rank: Rear-Admiral
- Commands: HMS L27; HMS Porpoise; 10th Submarine Flotilla
- Conflicts: World War II
- Awards: Companion of the Order of the Bath; Commander of the Order of the British Empire

Rear-Admiral George Walter Gillow Simpson CB CBE (6 June 1901 – 2 March 1972) was a Royal Navy officer who became Flag Officer Submarines.

== Naval career ==
Educated at the Royal Naval College, Osborne and the Royal Naval College, Dartmouth, Simpson was commissioned into the Royal Navy in 1917. He became commanding officer of the submarine HMS L27 in 1935 and of the submarine HMS Porpoise in August 1938. He became commander of the 10th Submarine Flotilla, based at Malta in January 1941, during the Second World War, in which role his mission was to prevent enemy supplies reaching North Africa. He went on to be Commodore Western Approaches in April 1943.

Simpson became Chief of the New Zealand Navy Staff in 1948, Flag Officer Germany in 1951 and Flag Officer Submarines in 1952. In this role he was dual-hatted as NATO Commander Submarine Force Eastern Atlantic. He retired in March 1954. He died at Whangārei in New Zealand on 2 March 1972 and was buried at Maunu Lawn Cemetery in Whangārei.

== Family ==
In 1945 Simpson married Alison Hall; they had two sons and a daughter.

Military offices
Preceded by Sydney Raw	Flag Officer Submarines; 1952–1954	Succeeded by George Fawkes
