= L33 =

L33 may refer to:

- CITER 155mm L33 Gun, an Argentinian artillery field gun
- General Motors L33 engine
- HMS L33, a submarine of the Royal Navy
- HMS Vivien (L33), a destroyer of the Royal Navy
- Let L-33 Solo, a Czech glider
- Mitochondrial ribosomal protein L33
- Nissan Altima (L33), a Japanese automobile
- Zeppelin LZ 76, an airship of the Imperial German Navy
