= USS Paulding =

Paulding-class destroyer

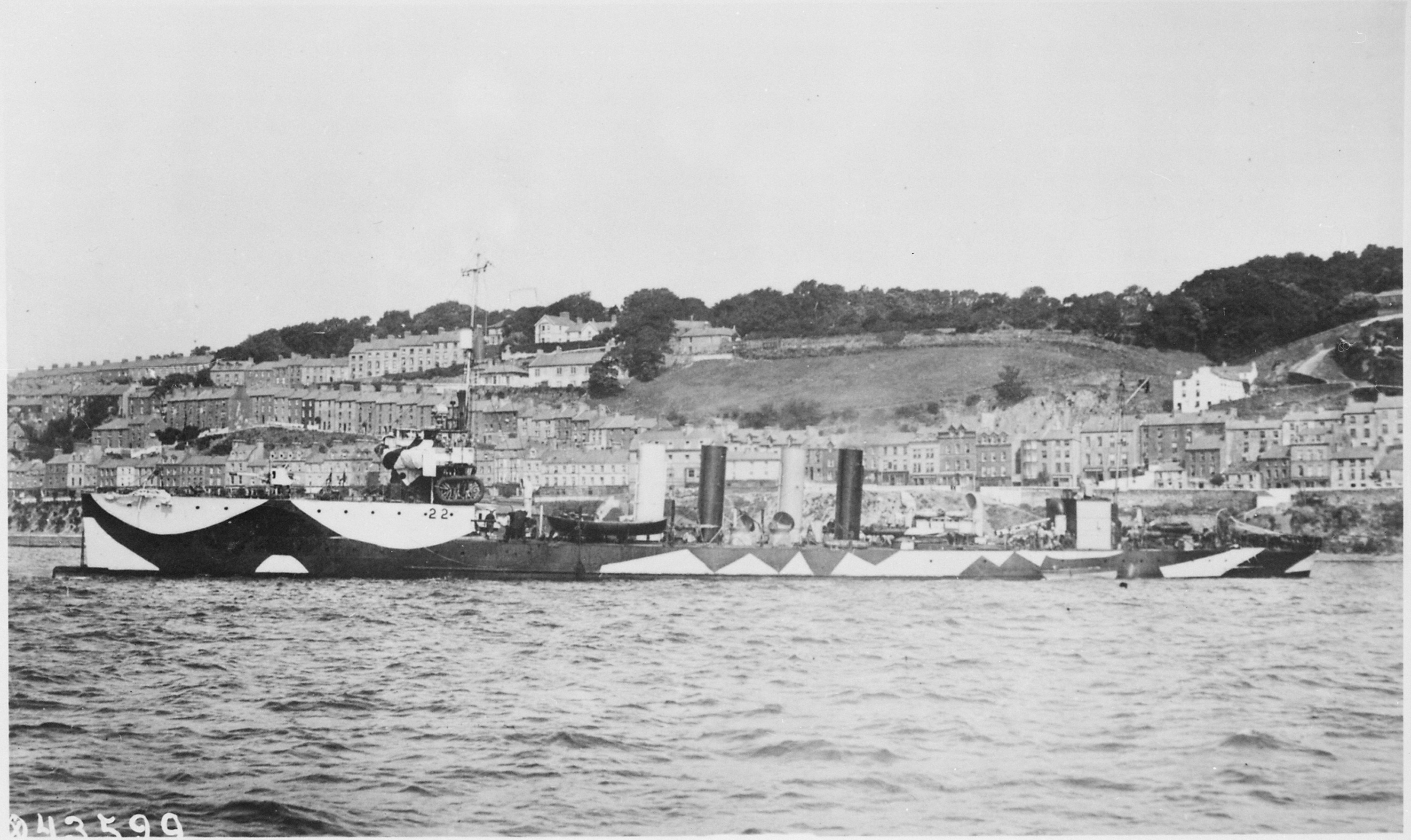
- USS Paulding (DD-22) port side, camouflaged, Queenstown, Ireland, 1918

History

United States
- Name: Paulding
- Namesake: Rear Admiral Hiram A. Paulding
- Builder: Bath Iron Works Bath, Maine
- Cost: $652,928.16
- Laid down: 24 July 1909
- Launched: 12 April 1910
- Sponsored by: Miss Emma Paulding
- Commissioned: 29 September 1910
- Decommissioned: August 1919
- Stricken: 28 June 1934
- Identification: Hull symbol:DD-22; Code letters:NON
- Fate: Transferred to the United States Coast Guard, returned 1930 and scrapped in 1934

United States
- Name: Paulding
- Acquired: 28 April 1924
- Commissioned: 23 January 1925
- Decommissioned: 18 October 1930
- Identification: Hull symbol:CG-17
- Fate: Transferred back to the United States Navy, 18 October 1930

General characteristics
- Class & type: Paulding-class destroyer
- Displacement: 742 long tons (754 t) normal; 887 long tons (901 t) full load
- Length: 293 ft 10 in (89.56 m)
- Beam: 27 ft (8.2 m)
- Draft: 8 ft 4 in (2.54 m) (mean)
- Installed power: 12,000 ihp (8,900 kW)
- Propulsion: 4 × boilers; 3 × Parsons Direct Drive Turbines; 3 × shafts
- Speed: 29.5 kn (33.9 mph; 54.6 km/h); 30.80 kn (35.44 mph; 57.04 km/h) (Speed on Trial)
- Complement: 4 officers 87 enlisted
- Armament: 5 × 3 in (76 mm)/50 caliber guns; 6 × 18 inch (450 mm) torpedo tubes (3 × 2)

USS Paulding (DD-22) was the lead ship of Paulding-class destroyers in the United States Navy. She was named for Rear Admiral Hiram A. Paulding (1797–1878). She was in commission from 1910 to 1919 and saw service in World War I.

After her Navy service, Paulding served in the United States Coast Guard as USCGC Paulding (CG-17) from 1924 to 1930.

== Construction and commissioning ==
Paulding was laid down by the Bath Iron Works Corporation at Bath, Maine, on 24 July 1909. She was launched on 12 April 1910, sponsored by Miss Emma Paulding, and commissioned on 29 September 1910, Lieutenant Commander Yates Stirling Jr. in command. She was the first American destroyer solely fueled by fuel oil.

== United States Navy ==
Assigned to the Atlantic Torpedo Fleet, Paulding operated primarily off the United States East Coast until after the United States entered World War I on 6 April 1917. During April 1917, she patrolled off the New England coast and in May 1917 she prepared for distant service. On 21 May 1917, she got underway for the United Kingdom, arriving at Queenstown, Ireland, to escort convoys and protect them from Imperial German Navy U-boats. She served on that duty through the end of the war.

On 24 February 1918, Paulding was proceeding in a scouting line with the destroyers USS Davis and USS Trippe in the Atlantic Ocean off the south coast of Ireland bound for Queenstown when she sighted the British Royal Navy submarine HMS L2′s periscope. Mistaking L2 for a German U-boat, she headed for the periscope at flank speed and opened gunfire. L2 had sighted the destroyers and, assuming that the destroyers had not seen her periscope, submerged to 90 feet (27 m), but upon hearing Paulding open fire, she dove to 200 feet (61 m). Paulding dropped two depth charges, the first of which shook L2 severely and jammed her diving planes in a hard-upward position. This caused L2 to take on a tremendous inclination, and her stern struck the seabed at a depth of 300 feet (91 m). Four more depth charges exploded, again shaking the submarine. L2′s commanding officer gave the order to blow the number 5 and 6 ballast tanks, and L2 surfaced bow-first. Davis dropped a depth charge near her, and then all three destroyers opened gunfire on her from a range of about 1,500 yards (1,370 m). One round struck L2′s pressure hull just abaft her conning tower. Some of L2's crew emerged from her conning tower, waved their hands and a White Ensign, and fired a smoke grenade. The destroyers ceased fire immediately. L-2 did not sustain serious damage, and Davis escorted her to Berehaven, Ireland. The force commander of British submarines, Captain Martin Dunbar-Nasmith, commended L2 and the destroyers for the action in his report on the friendly fire incident. Admiral Lewis Bayly, the Royal Navy′s Commander-in-Chief, Coast of Ireland, in his endorsement of Nasmith′s report, wrote, "Had L-2 not been very skillfully and coolly handled, she would have been lost. The U. S. destroyers deserve great credit for their smartness in attack, and for their quickness in recognizing the submarine as British."

Paulding returned to the United States after the Armistice with Germany brought World War I to an end on 11 November 1918. She was decommissioned in August 1919 and placed in the Reserve Fleet.

== United States Coast Guard ==
The U.S. Navy loaned Paulding to the United States Coast Guard from 28 April 1924 to 18 October 1930. As USCGC Paulding, she served on the Rum Patrol during Prohibition with her home port at Boston, Massachusetts.

Paulding was sent to find the Coast Guard cutter USCGC CG-238 during a gale in February 1927 off Cape Cod, Massachusetts. The 75 ft (23 m) vessel had already foundered, and Paulding spent two days in the storm, losing much topside equipment, including one of her stacks.

On 17 December 1927, Paulding accidentally rammed and sank the U.S. Navy submarine USS S-4 (SS-109) while S-4 was surfacing. S-4 sank with the loss of all hands. An inquiry absolved the Coast Guard of blame.

== Final disposition ==
Returned to the U.S. Navy on 18 October 1930, Paulding again joined the Reserve Fleet and was laid up at League Island in Philadelphia, Pennsylvania. She was stricken from the Naval Vessel Register on 28 June 1934 and sold for scrap in accordance with the terms of the London Naval Treaty.

== Honors and awards ==
- World War I Victory Medal with DESTROYER clasp
