= HMS L6 =

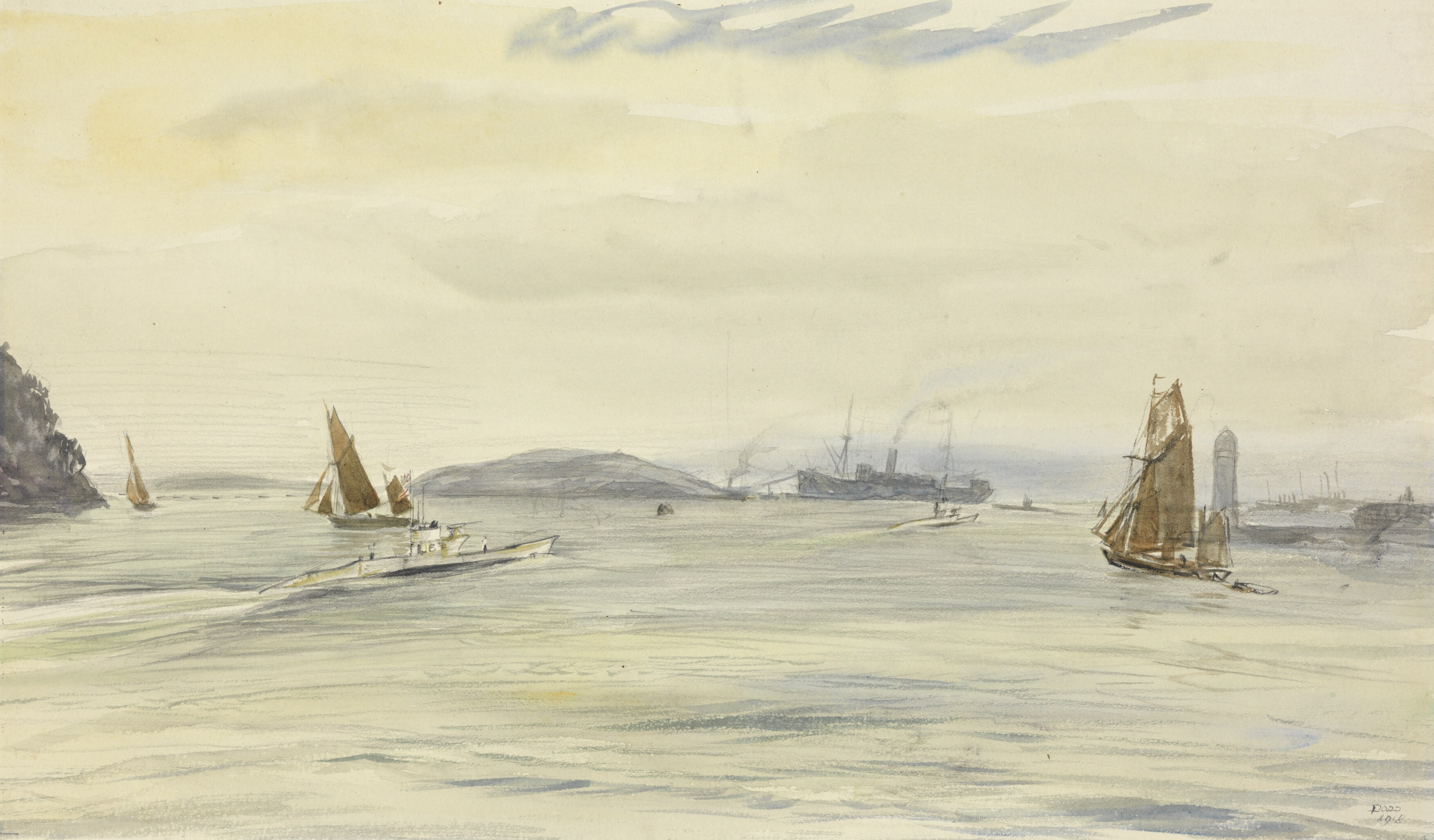
- HMS L6 and L8 by Francis Dodd

History

United Kingdom
- Name: HMS L6
- Builder: William Beardmore and Company, Dalmuir
- Laid down: October 1916
- Launched: 14 January 1918
- Commissioned: 3 July 1918
- Fate: Sold for scrapping, January 1935

General characteristics
- Class & type: L-class submarine
- Displacement: 891 long tons (905 t) surfaced; 1,074 long tons (1,091 t) submerged
- Length: 231 ft 1 in (70.4 m)
- Beam: 23 ft 6 in (7.2 m)
- Draught: 13 ft 3 in (4.0 m)
- Installed power: 2,400 bhp (1,800 kW) (diesel); 1,600 hp (1,200 kW) (electric)
- Propulsion: 2 × diesel engines; 2 × electric motors
- Speed: 17 kn (31 km/h; 20 mph) surfaced; 10.5 kn (19.4 km/h; 12.1 mph) submerged
- Range: 3,800 nmi (7,000 km; 4,400 mi) at 10 kn (19 km/h; 12 mph) on the surface
- Test depth: 100 feet (30.5 m)
- Complement: 35
- Armament: 6 × 18 in (457 mm) torpedo tubes (4 bow, 2 beam); 1 × 4-inch deck gun

HMS L6 was a L-class submarine built for the Royal Navy during World War I. The boat survived the war and was sold for scrap in 1935.

== Design and description ==
The L-class boats were enlarged and improved versions of the preceding E class. The submarine had a length of 231 feet 1 inch (70.4 m) overall, a beam of 23 feet 6 inches (7.2 m) and a mean draught of 13 feet 3 inches (4.0 m). They displaced 891 long tons (905 t) on the surface and 1,074 long tons (1,091 t) submerged. The L-class submarines had a crew of 35 officers and ratings.

For surface running, the boats were powered by two 12-cylinder Vickers 1,200-brake-horsepower (895 kW) diesel engines, each driving one propeller shaft. When submerged each propeller was driven by a 600-horsepower (447 kW) electric motor. They could reach 17 knots (31 km/h; 20 mph) on the surface and 10.5 knots (19.4 km/h; 12.1 mph) underwater. On the surface, the L class had a range of 3,200 nautical miles (5,900 km; 3,700 mi) at 10 knots (19 km/h; 12 mph).

The boats were armed with a total of six 18-inch (45 cm) torpedo tubes. Four of these were in the bow and the remaining pair in broadside mounts. They carried 10 reload torpedoes, all for the bow tubes. They were also armed with a 4-inch (102 mm) deck gun.

== Construction and career ==
HMS L3 was laid down on 19 October 1916 by William Beardmore and Company at their Dalmuir shipyard, launched on 14 January 1918, and completed on 3 July 1918. She was based at Falmouth, Cornwall in 1918.

HMS L6 was assigned to the 4th Submarine Flotilla and HMS Titania in 1919 and sailed to Hong Kong, arriving on 14 April 1920.

HMS L6 was sold for scrap in January 1935 in Newport, Monmouthshire.
