= USS Trippe (DD-33) =

Paulding-class destroyer

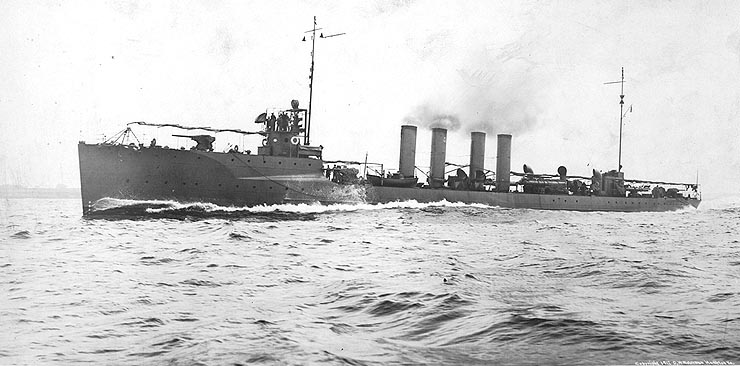
- USS Trippe (DD-33) underway in 1912

History

United States
- Name: Trippe
- Namesake: Lieutenant John Trippe
- Builder: Bath Iron Works, Bath, Maine
- Cost: $653,564.22
- Laid down: 12 April 1910
- Launched: 20 December 1910
- Sponsored by: Mrs. John S. Hyde
- Commissioned: 23 March 1911
- Decommissioned: 6 November 1919
- Stricken: 5 July 1934
- Identification: Hull symbol:DD-33; Code letters:NUQ
- Fate: 7 June 1924, transferred to the United States Coast Guard; 22 August 1934, sold for scrapping

United States
- Name: Trippe
- Acquired: 7 June 1924
- Commissioned: 24 June 1924
- Decommissioned: 15 April 1931
- Identification: Hull symbol:CG-20
- Fate: Transferred back to the United States Navy, 2 May 1931

General characteristics
- Class & type: Paulding-class destroyer
- Displacement: 742 long tons (754 t) normal; 887 long tons (901 t) full load
- Length: 293 ft 10 in (89.56 m)
- Beam: 27 ft (8.2 m)
- Draft: 8 ft 4 in (2.54 m) (mean)
- Installed power: 12,000 ihp (8,900 kW)
- Propulsion: 4 × boilers; 3 × Parsons Direct Drive Turbines; 3 × shafts
- Speed: 29.5 kn (33.9 mph; 54.6 km/h); 30.89 kn (35.55 mph; 57.21 km/h) (Speed on Trial)
- Complement: 4 officers 87 enlisted
- Armament: 5 × 3 in (76 mm)/50 caliber guns; 6 × 18 inch (450 mm) torpedo tubes (3 × 2)

The second USS Trippe (DD-33) was a Paulding-class destroyer in commission in the United States Navy from 1911 to 1919. She was named for Lieutenant John Trippe. She saw service during World War I.

After Trippe′s U.S. Navy service ended, she served in the United States Coast Guard as USCGC Trippe (CG-20) from 1924 to 1931.

== Construction and commissioning ==
Trippe was laid down on 12 April 1910 at Bath, Maine, by the Bath Iron Works. She was launched on 20 December 1910, sponsored by Mrs. John S. Hyde, and commissioned at the Boston Navy Yard in Boston, Massachusetts, on 23 March 1911, Lieutenant Frank D. Berrien in command.

== Service history ==
=== United States Navy ===
==== 1911–1917 ====
Trippe completed sea trials in 1911, and upon commissioning joined the destroyers and submarines assigned to the Atlantic Torpedo Fleet and began routine operations along the United States East Coast. In 1911, she participated in exercises off Newport, Rhode Island; Boston; and the Virginia Capes. She made her first cruise to southern waters in 1912, departing Newport on 3 January 1912 and dropping anchor at Guantanamo Bay, Cuba, on 14 January. Following three months of training at Guantanamo Bay and in the Gulf of Mexico, she returned north in April 1912 and entered Boston Harbor on 21 April. After repairs, she resumed training operations off the coast of the Northeastern United States. On 2 January 1913, she headed south once more for three months of tactical exercises and gunnery drills from Guantanamo Bay and in the Gulf of Guacanayabo. She returned to Boston on 14 April 1913 and spent the remainder of 1913 in operations off the U.S. coast between Boston and Norfolk, Virginia.

In January 1914, Trippe headed south and conducted battle practice in the Caribbean through the end of March 1914. In April 1914, the Tampico Affair brought her to Mexico when U.S. Navy sailors and United States Marines went ashore at Veracruz and seized the customs house on 21 April 1914. Trippe arrived off Tampico, Mexico, on 22 April 1914 and patrolled the area for a week to prevent Mexico from landing arms there. On 1 May 1914, she steamed south to Veracruz, where she conducted more patrols and supported the battleships and cruisers operating in the vicinity. Near the end of May, she departed Mexican waters, and on 31 May 1914 she entered Boston Harbor.

After the completion of an extensive overhaul, Trippe conducted sea trials and drills in the Boston area from mid-August to late September 1914. On 30 September 1914, she arrived at Newport for a week of operations before heading south. She shifted to Hampton Roads, Virginia, in mid-October 1914 and participated in exercises there and at Lynnhaven Bay on the coast of Virginia at the mouth of the Chesapeake Bay for a month before returning to Boston.

Trippe spent December 1914 and the first three weeks of January 1915 in the Boston area. On 26 January 1915, she arrived in Guantanamo Bay to resume her schedule of winter drills in the Caribbean. Late in March 1915, she headed northward and reached Boston on 6 April 1915. After her normal round of maneuvers off the coast of the northeastern United States, she returned to Boston on 23 October 1915.

On 13 December 1915, Trippe became a unit of the newly organized 2nd Reserve Flotilla. On 5 January 1916, she was designated a "destroyer operating with reduced complement," and on 27 January 1916, she was placed in ordinary at the Boston Navy Yard.

World War I had been raging in Europe since the summer of 1914 and, with the threat of the United States entering the war increasing, Trippe was placed in full commission once again at Boston on 25 July 1916. She trained along the U.S. coast for the next eight months.

==== World War I ====
The United States declared war on the German Empire on 6 April 1917. Trippe continued to operate off the U.S. coast until early May 1917, when she entered port at Boston and commenced preparations for duty overseas.

On 21 May 1917, Trippe got underway from Boston for the United Kingdom. After a port call at St. John's, Newfoundland, Canada, she arrived at Queenstown on the southern coast of Ireland, the location of a major wartime American destroyer base. She paused only long enough to refuel and make voyage repairs before clearing the harbor on 5 June 1917 for her first patrol. From Queenstown, she escorted Allied convoys on the last leg of their voyage from North America to England and France. Her area of operations, situated as it was in the war zone which Germany had established around the British Isles on 5 February 1915, was the prime hunting ground of German U-boats. When not engaged in escorting convoys, she patrolled the waters around Queenstown in an effort to detect and destroy as many German submarines as possible.

Trippe had only one verified engagement with a German U-boat. On 18 September 1917, she and the destroyer USS Jacob Jones were steaming in company in the Atlantic Ocean some 350 nautical miles (648 km; 403 mi) west of Brest, France, when, shortly after 02:00, she sighted the distinctive wake of the periscope of a submarine running on a parallel course, but in the opposite direction. Trippe dropped depth charges, but without visible results, and continued on to rendezvous with an eastbound convoy. That night, she encountered a raging storm, and waves carried her starboard waist gun platform overboard. Trippe nonetheless successfully shepherded her convoy into Quiberon Bay on the coast of France, made repairs quickly, and resumed her routine.

On 24 February 1918, Trippe was proceeding in a scouting line with the destroyers USS Davis and USS Paulding in the Atlantic Ocean off the south coast of Ireland bound for Queenstown when Paulding sighted the British Royal Navy submarine HMS L2′s periscope. Mistaking L2 for a German U-boat, Paulding headed for the periscope at flank speed and opened gunfire. L2 had sighted the destroyers and, assuming that the destroyers had not seen her periscope, submerged to 90 feet (27 m), but upon hearing Paulding open fire, she dove to 200 feet (61 m). Paulding dropped two depth charges, the first of which shook L2 severely and jammed her diving planes in a hard-upward position. This caused L2 to take on a tremendous inclination, and her stern struck the seabed at a depth of 300 feet (91 m). Four more depth charges exploded, again shaking the submarine. L2′s commanding officer gave the order to blow the number 5 and 6 ballast tanks, and L2 surfaced bow-first. Davis dropped a depth charge near her, and then all three destroyers opened gunfire on her from a range of about 1,500 yards (1,370 m). One round struck L2′s pressure hull just abaft her conning tower. Some of L2's crew emerged from her conning tower, waved their hands and a White Ensign, and fired a smoke grenade. The destroyers ceased fire immediately. L-2 did not sustain serious damage, and Davis escorted her to Berehaven, Ireland. The force commander of British submarines, Captain Martin Dunbar-Nasmith, commended L2 and the destroyers for the action in his report on the friendly fire incident. Admiral Lewis Bayly, the Royal Navy′s Commander-in-Chief, Coast of Ireland, in his endorsement of Nasmith′s report, wrote, "Had L-2 not been very skillfully and coolly handled, she would have been lost. The U. S. destroyers deserve great credit for their smartness in attack, and for their quickness in recognizing the submarine as British."

On 11 November 1918, the day of the signing of the armistice with Germany that brought World War I to an end, Trippe was in port at Queenstown.

==== December 1918–July 1919 ====
In mid-December 1918, Trippe departed Queenstown. She refueled in the Azores and at Bermuda and returned to Boston on 3 January 1919. After six months of operations along the U.S. East Coast, she entered the Philadelphia Navy Yard on League Island in Philadelphia, Pennsylvania, on 23 July 1919 for pre-inactivation overhaul. On 6 November 1919, she was decommissioned and placed in reserve there.

=== United States Coast Guard ===
By 1924, Prohibition had spawned a thriving illegal traffic in the smuggling of alcoholic beverages into the United States. The United States Coast Guard's small fleet, charged with stopping the illegal importation of alcoholic beverages, was unequal to the task. Consequently, President Calvin Coolidge proposed increasing the Coast Guard's fleet by transferring 20 of the U.S. Navy's inactive destroyers, and the United States Congress authorized the necessary funds on 2 April 1924. U.S. Coast Guardsmen and U.S. Navy shipyard workers overhauled Trippe's hull, stripped her of depth-charge gear and torpedo tubes, and removed one of her four guns. On 7 June 1924, the U.S. Navy transferred Trippe to the United States Department of the Treasury and, after five years of inactivity, Trippe was placed in commission in the U.S. Coast Guard as USCGC Trippe (CG-20) with Lieutenant Commander John H. Cornell, USCG, in command. For the next four years, Trippe operated from New London, Connecticut, along the northeastern coast of the United States as a cutter on the Coast Guard's "Rum Patrol."

Trippe was placed in reduced commission at New London on 5 January 1929. In October 1929 she was moved to Stapleton, New York. From January to March 1930, she underwent an overhaul at the New York Navy Yard in Brooklyn, New York. After a month of gunnery exercises off St. Petersburg, Florida, she returned to Stapleton on 23 April 1930 to resume operations along the U.S. coast.

On 18 December 1930, Trippe departed Stapleton for the Philadelphia Navy Yard. The Coast Guard decommissioned Trippe at Philadelphia on 15 April 1931 and returned her to the Navy on 2 May 1931.

== Final disposition ==
Trippe remained in reserve at Philadelphia until 1934. Her name was struck from the Naval Vessel Register on 5 July 1934. She was sold to Michael Flynn, Inc of Brooklyn, New York, on 22 August 1934 and subsequently scrapped.
