= Frederick Parham =

Royal Navy Admiral (1901–1991)

Admiral Sir Frederick Parham GBE KCB DSO
- Born: 9 January 1901; Bath, Somerset, England
- Died: 20 March 1991 (aged 90); Chichester, West Sussex, England
- Military career
- Allegiance: United Kingdom
- Branch: Royal Navy
- Service years: 1913–1959
- Rank: Admiral
- Commands: HMS Shikari; HMS Gurkha; HMS Belfast; HMS Vanguard; Nore Command
- Conflicts: World War I World War II
- Awards: Knight Grand Cross of the Order of the British Empire; Knight Commander of the Order of the Bath; Distinguished Service Order

Admiral Sir Frederick Robertson Parham, GBE, KCB, DSO (9 January 1901 – 20 March 1991) was a Royal Navy officer who went on to be Commander-in-Chief, The Nore.

== Naval career ==
Educated at the Revd Gregoire's preparatory school at Ashley Manor, Box, Wiltshire, the Royal Naval College, Osborne, and the Royal Naval College, Dartmouth, Parham joined the Royal Navy as a cadet in 1913. He served in World War I as a midshipman on HMS Malaya. In 1937 he was given command of HMS Shikari.

He saw active service in the Second World War as Captain of the destroyer HMS Gurkha, which was sunk by enemy action in 1940. From 1942 he had command of the cruiser HMS Belfast which remains permanently moored as a museum ship in London.

After the War Parham commanded the battleship HMS Vanguard and then, in 1949 became Deputy Chief of Naval Personnel. He was made Flag Officer (Flotillas) and Second in Command of the Mediterranean Fleet in 1951 and Fourth Sea Lord and Chief of Supplies and Transport in 1954. Finally he was made Commander-in-Chief, The Nore, in 1955. He retired on 31 January 1959.

In retirement Parham chaired a Parliamentary Committee on Inland Waterways.

== Family ==
In 1926, he married Kathleen Dobrée; they had one son. Following the death of his first wife, he married Joan Charig Saunders in 1978.

Military offices
Preceded by Sir Sydney Raw	Fourth Sea Lord; 1954–1955	Succeeded by Sir Dymock Watson
Preceded by Sir Geoffrey Oliver	Commander-in-Chief, The Nore; 1955–1958	Succeeded by Sir Robin Durnford-Slater
