= Sydney Raw =

British naval officer

Vice-Admiral Sir Sydney Raw KBE CB
- Born: 1898
- Died: 1967 (aged 68–69)
- Military career
- Allegiance: United Kingdom
- Branch: Royal Navy
- Rank: Vice-Admiral
- Commands: HMS Medway; HMS Phoebe
- Conflicts: World War I World War II
- Awards: Knight Commander of the Order of the British Empire; Companion of the Order of the Bath

Vice-Admiral Sir Sydney Moffatt Raw KBE CB (1898–1967) was a Royal Navy officer who went on to be Fourth Sea Lord.

== Naval career ==
Raw served in World War I and fought at the Battle of Jutland in 1916. He also served in World War II and led the naval work on the recovery of the submarine HMS Thetis off Anglesey in 1939 before being given command of the submarine tender HMS Medway in 1940 and being appointed Chief of Staff to the Admiral (Submarines) in 1942. He also commanded the cruiser HMS Phoebe during operations on the Burma coast from 1944.

In 1947 he was appointed Commodore at the Royal Naval Barracks Devonport before becoming Flag Officer Submarines in 1950 and Fourth Sea Lord and Chief of Supplies and Transport in 1952.

Military offices
Preceded by Guy Grantham	Flag Officer Submarines; 1950–1952	Succeeded by George Simpson
Preceded by Earl Mountbatten	Fourth Sea Lord; 1952–1954	Succeeded by Sir Frederick Parham
