= Irene incident =

1927 British Royal Navy action against Chinese pirates

Irene Incident
- Part of Piracy in Asia
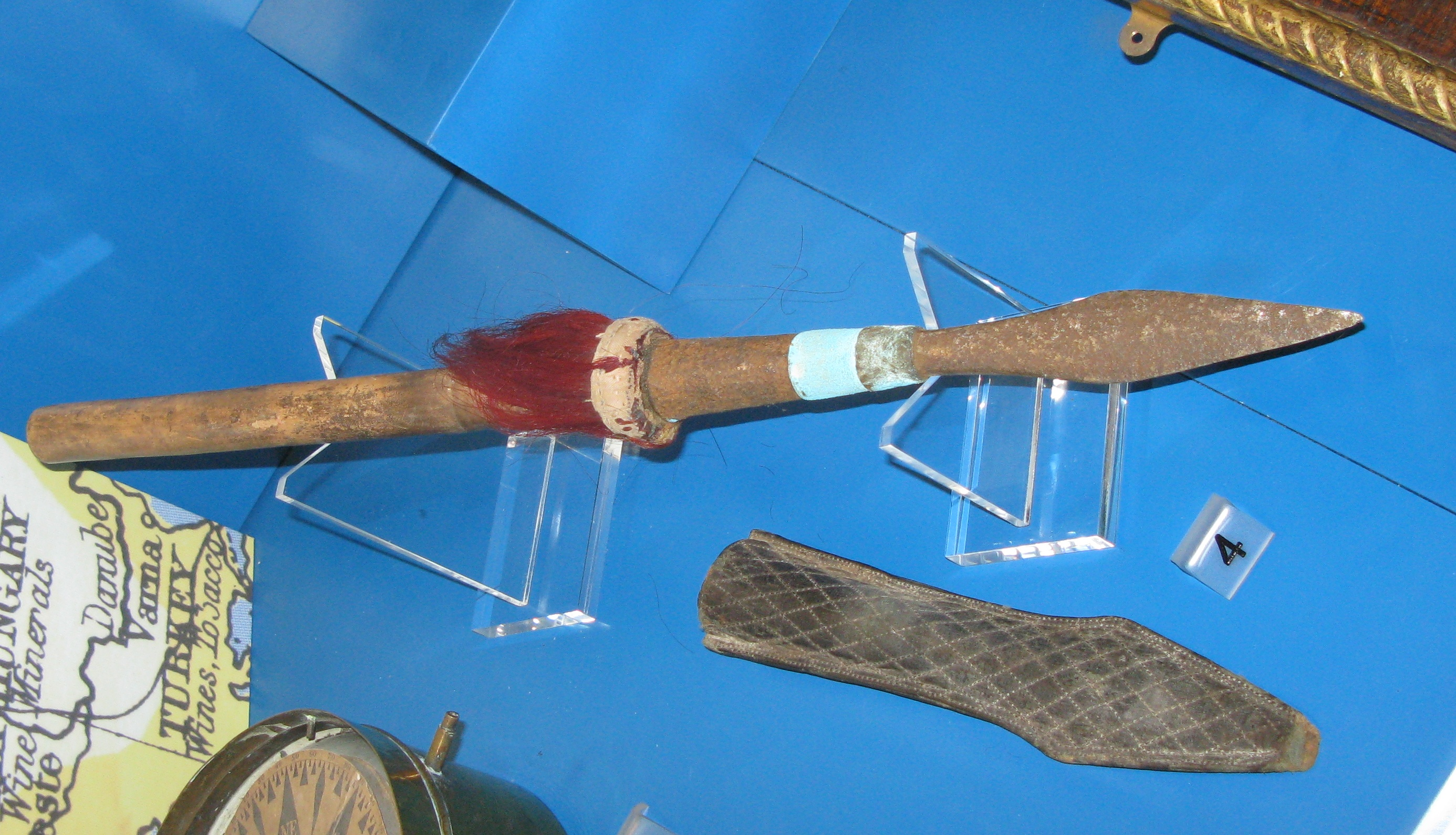
- A spear taken as a prize of war from Chinese pirates by British forces during the engagement
| Date | 19–20 October 1927 |
| Location | Bias Bay, South China Sea |
| Result | British victory |

Belligerents
| United Kingdom | Pirates |

Commanders and leaders
| (United Kingdom) Frederick Halahan | Unknown |

Strength
| 2 submarines (HMS L4 & HMS L5); 1 destroyer (HMS Stormcloud); 1 cruiser (HMS Delhi); 1 minesweeper (HMS Magnolia); Hong Kong Police | 1 steamship (SS Irene) |

Casualties and losses
| None | ~1 killed 17 captured SS Irene sunk |
- Civilian casualties: 14 passengers on SS Irene died.

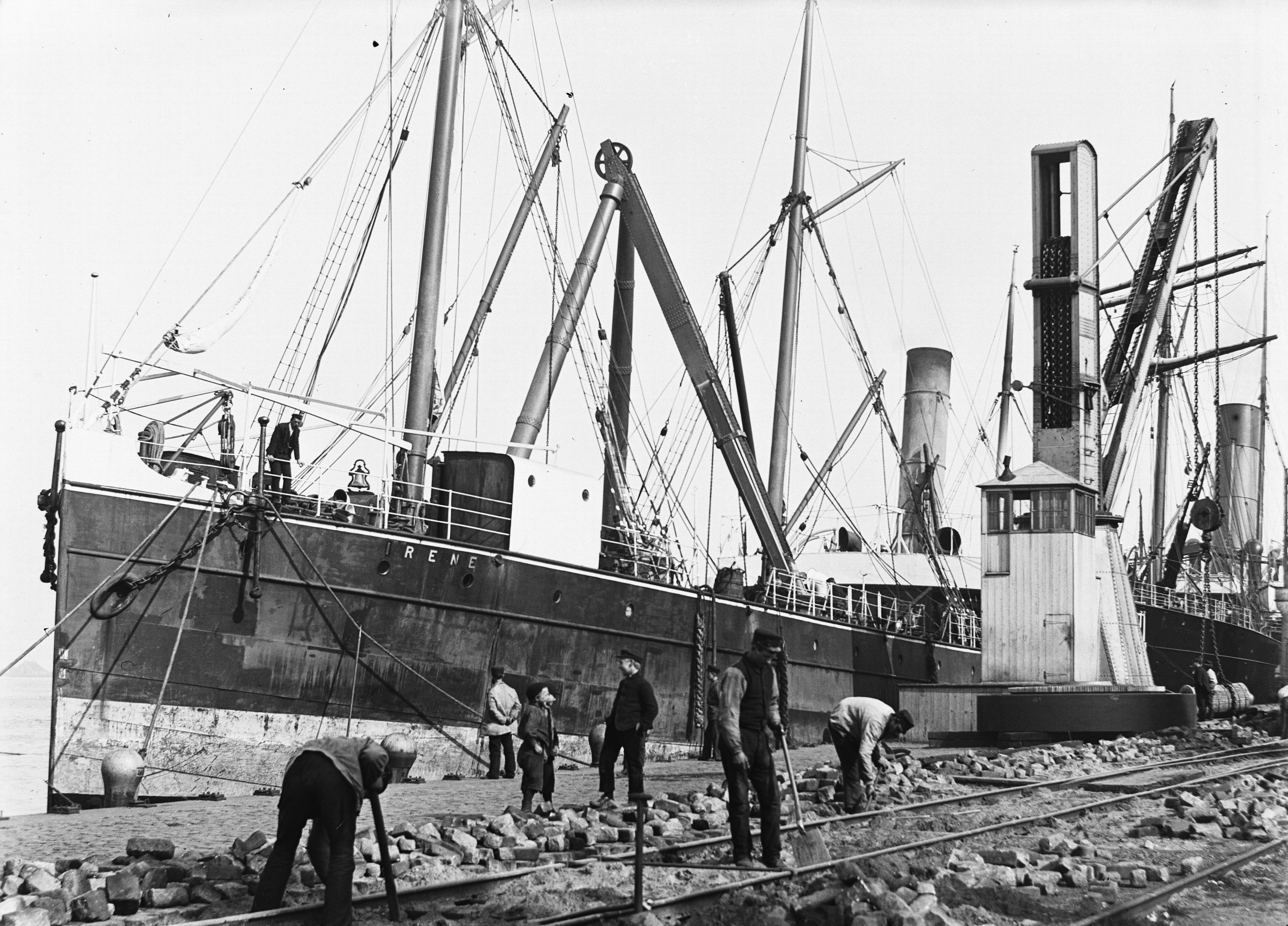
The Irene in Amsterdam, 1894

The Irene incident was a 1927 British anti-piracy operation in China. In an attempt to surprise the pirates of Bias Bay about sixty miles from British Hong Kong, Royal Navy submarines attacked the steamship SS Irene, of the China Merchants Steam Navigation Company, which had been taken over by the pirates on the night of 19 October. The British were successful in thwarting the hijacking though they sank the ship.

== Background ==
Following the end of the Age of Sail, the pirates of southern China were forced to change tactics when it came to taking over merchant ships. New steam-powered vessels, used both by the navies and the merchants, rendered fleets of heavily armed sailing junks useless. By 1927, the pirates had perfected the tactic of boarding a merchant vessel disguised as passengers and then taking control at sea. Some of the most successful groups of pirates at the time were based in Bias Bay. There the outlaws would hijack a vessel as close to the bay as possible and then anchor it close to shore to offload valuables and hold hostages. On more than one occasion when British warships were sent into the area, the pirates were forewarned and thus escaped arrest. The Royal Navy responded with a plan to stealthily patrol the area with submarines. The British fleet at Hong Kong included twelve submarines, so they assigned the L-class boats HMS L4, under Lieutenant Frederick John Crosby Halahan, and HMS L5 to the operation in October 1927. The two submarines left under everyone's assumption that routine exercises were to take place, though they were actually sailing for the bay.

== Incident ==
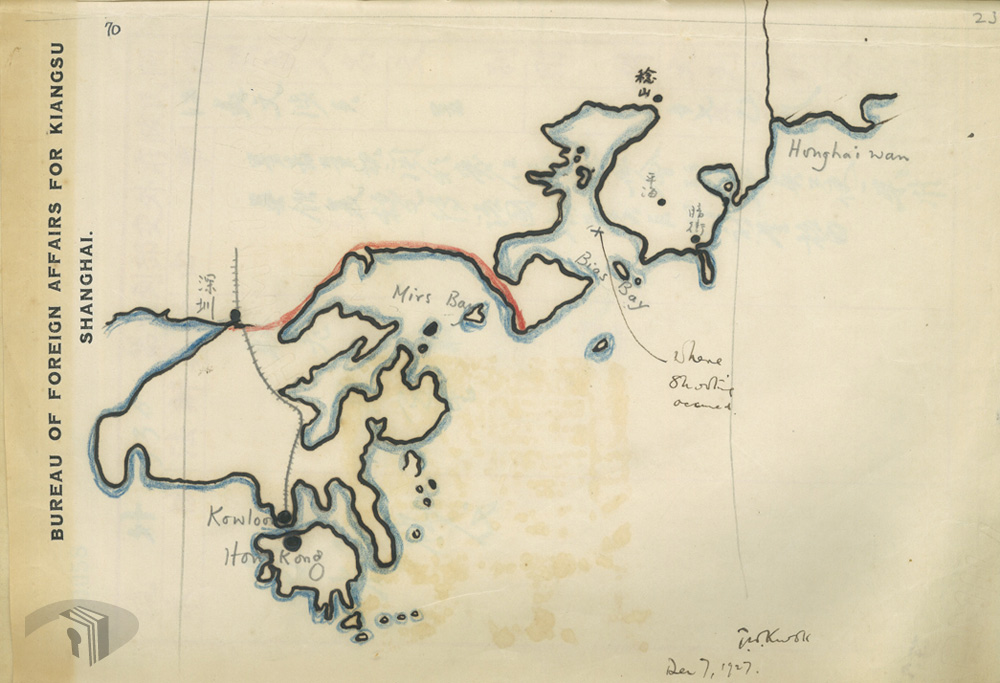
incident location

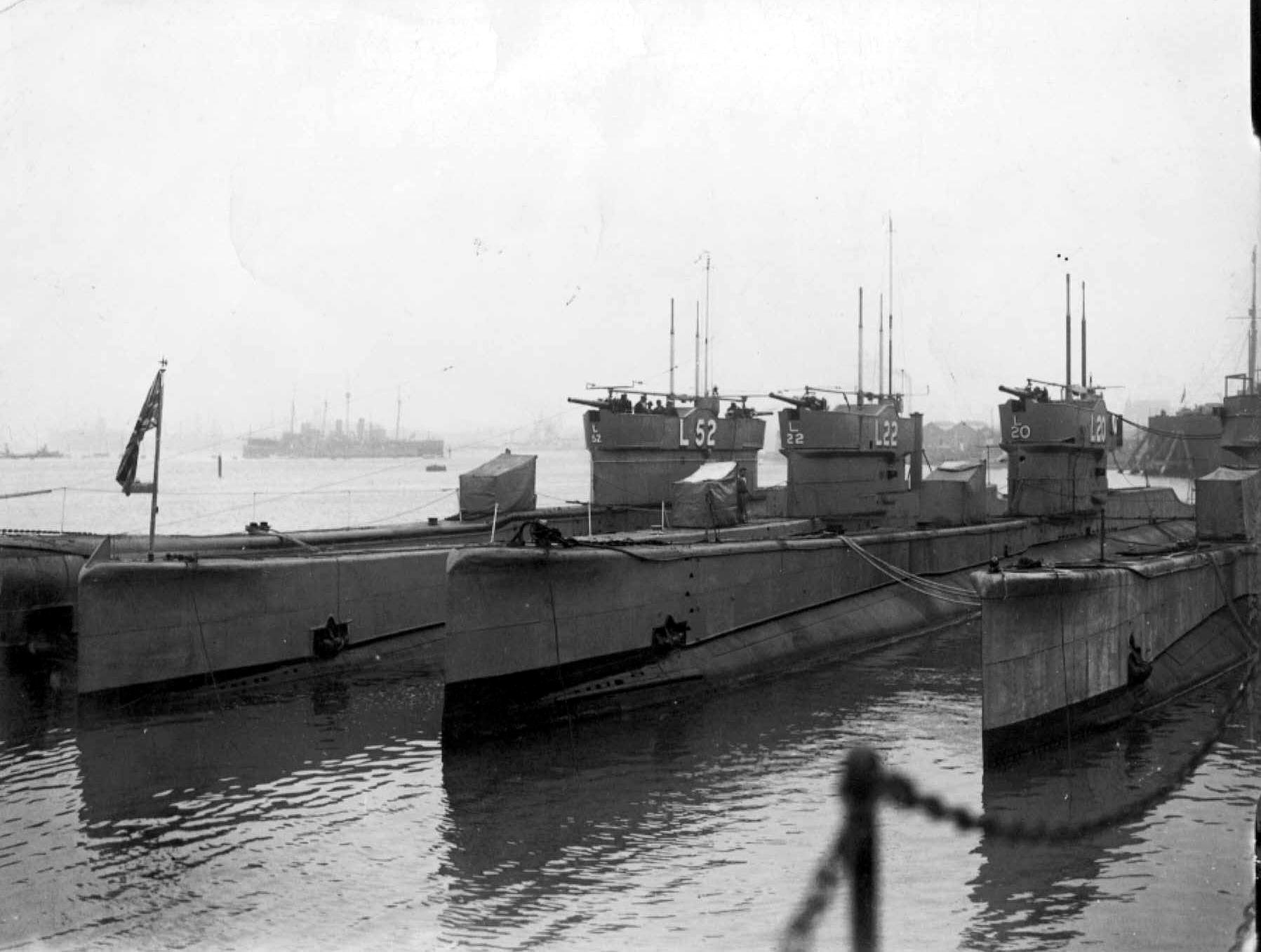
L-class submarines at Gosport in 1933. The type of 4-inch guns used against SS Irene can be seen mounted on the conning towers.

When the two submarines arrived they were off Mendoza Island (later named Shenggao Island) at the entrance of the bay. The two then split up. L4 went to patrol around the entrance of the bay and Halahan ordered L5 to patrol within. Bias Bay is surrounded by rocks and that night there was a fleet of fishing junks sheltering inside and constantly moving around the anchorage. Both the rocks and the junks made it difficult for the British to monitor the area without being detected, though they succeeded in doing so, and on the morning of 20 October they encountered Irene steaming off Cake Island. She had been taken over by at least eighteen pirates armed with automatic pistols. It was still dark so L4 was surface cruising with one crew at the 4-inch (102 mm) gun and another at the vessel's searchlight. Lieutenant Halahan knew that torpedoes were not helpful in recapturing a pirate-held ship but he did have a 4-inch deck gun. Then Irene was spotted so Halahan maneuvered his submarine into position for firing, and when the order was given, the search light was turned on and the gun crew fired a blank warning shot at the steamer. When the shot was ignored a second, live round was fired and it blew a hole straight through the ship and killed a pirate who was standing on deck.

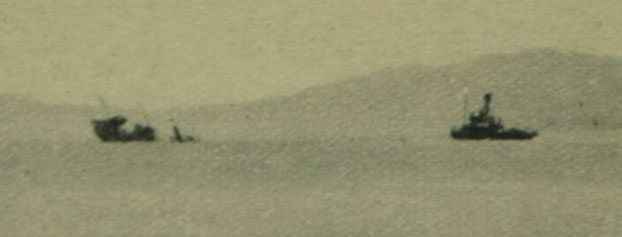
The sinking SS Irene (left) and tug Alliance (right)

The pirates still paid no attention and continued their attempt to make it to shore, so the 4-inch gun was opened up on them again. By this time L5 had arrived in the area and her crew counted eight muzzle flashes from L4's deck gun. Lieutenant Gilbert Hackforth Jones reported that they were too far away at that time to open fire themselves, but they could see Irene burning after being struck by multiple rounds. At that point Lieutenant Halahan signaled L5 that lifeboats were being lowered from the steamer and that he was maneuvering in to rescue the survivors. L5 followed suit and both submarines dispatched a boat with one officer and one sailor each to go aboard the burning Irene. The pirates on board were counting on this and they were waiting for the British to move in close before responding, and when they did, the pirates revealed themselves from their hiding places and opened fire. Their shots were inaccurate, though, and went over the heads of the sailors. The submarines then turned around so they could open fire again with their deck guns. After a few additional shots, one struck something flammable on board the steamer and a large, "blinding" explosion was observed. Following that the pirates offered no more resistance and abandoned ship, some of them drowning in the cold water.

== Aftermath ==
Irene was then burning well so additional vessels were sent for. Most of Irene's 258 passengers were saved though fourteen were never seen again. All the survivors were taken on board the submarines and later transferred to the Admiralty S-class destroyer HMS Stormcloud, the cruiser HMS Delhi and the minesweeper HMS Magnolia, which also assisted in putting out the fire on the ship. The British put out the fire but because they had sprayed so much water into the vessel she eventually capsized and sank the following day. Several men received decorations for their conduct in rescuing survivors, including Lieutenant Halahan who received the Distinguished Service Cross. The Hong Kong police managed to filter out several of the pirates who tried to blend in with their hostages during the rescue and seven more were taken by L5. Jones said that they found the pirates naked in a lifeboat and crying so they were assumed to be civilians and taken aboard in blankets. It was a few days later when the crew of L5 were informed that the seven men they picked up were responsible for the hijacking.

In the end, seventeen Chinese were found guilty of piracy and hanged for it in Hong Kong, though some sources say only ten pirates were executed. The owners of Irene later tried to sue Lieutenant Halahan but he won the case on the grounds that any naval commander has the authority to sink any ship controlled by pirates. Irene remained partly underwater for some time, with her masts sticking out, but she was later salvaged and returned to duty.

== Bibliography ==
- Sellick, Douglas R. G. (2010). Pirate Outrages: True Stories of Terror on the China Seas. Fremantle: Fremantle Press. ISBN 978-1-921696-07-7.
