= USS Davis (DD-65) =

Sampson-class destroyer

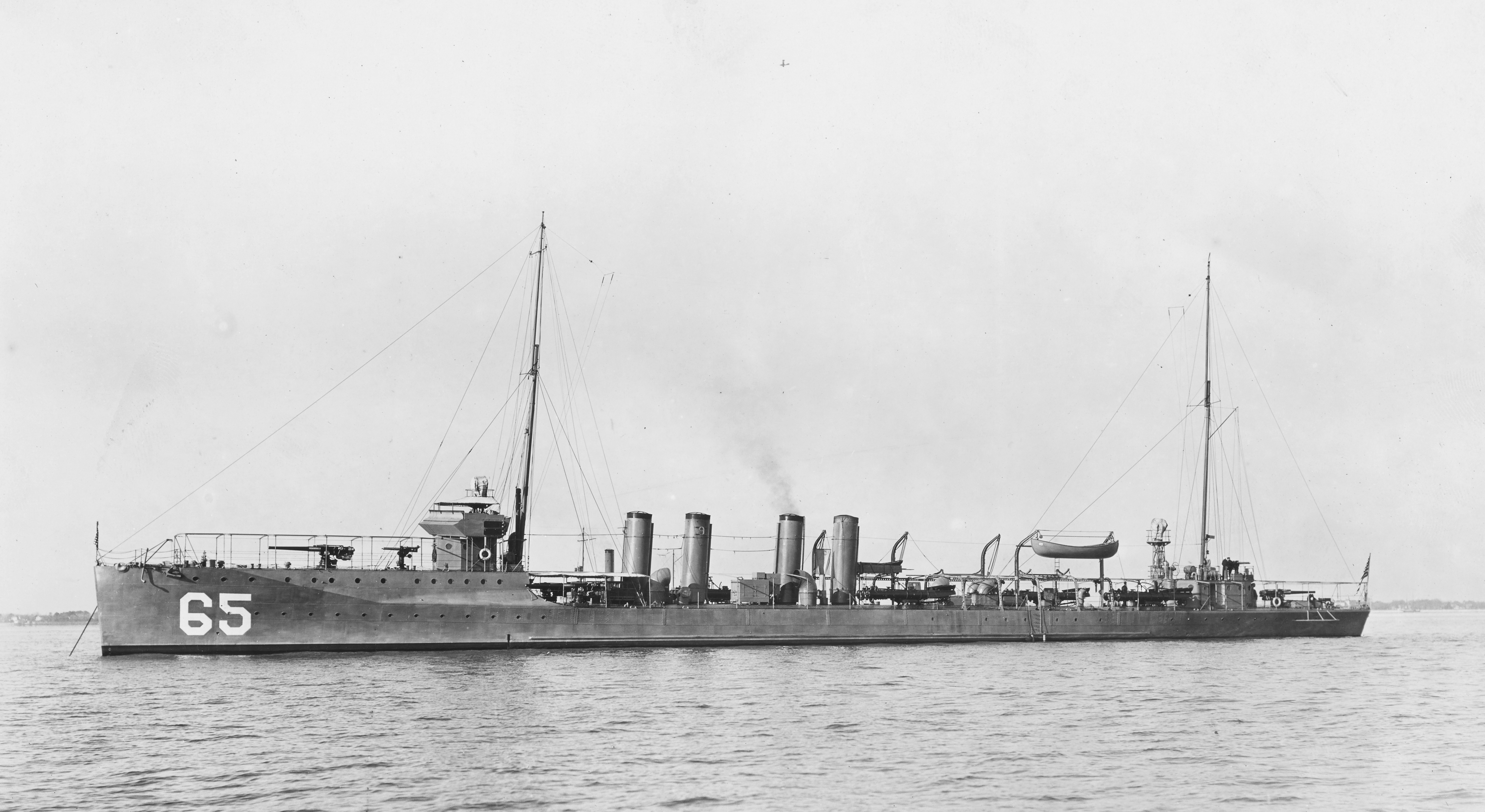
- USS Davis (DD-65)

History

United States
- Name: USS Davis
- Namesake: Rear Admiral Charles Henry Davis (1807-1877).
- Laid down: 7 May 1915
- Launched: 15 August 1916
- Commissioned: 5 October 1916
- Decommissioned: 20 June 1922
- Identification: DD-65
- Fate: Sold to the USCGC Davis

United States
- Name: USCGC Davis
- Acquired: 25 March 1926
- Commissioned: 4 September 1926
- Decommissioned: 20 June 1933
- Identification: CG-21
- Fate: Returned to the Navy on June 30, 1933 then scrapped on August 22, 1934

General characteristics
- Class & type: Sampson-class destroyer
- Displacement: 1,111 tons (normal), 1,225 tons (full load)
- Length: 315 ft 3 in (96.09 m)
- Beam: 30 ft 7 in (9.32 m)
- Draft: 10 ft 9 in (3.28 m)
- Propulsion: 4 Boilers; 2 Curtis Turbines: 17,696 hp (13,196 kW)
- Speed: 29.5 knots (54.6 km/h; 33.9 mph)
- Complement: 99 officers and crew
- Armament: 4 × 4-inch (100 mm)/50 guns; 2 × 1-pounder (37 mm) AA guns; 12 × 21 inch (533 mm) torpedo tubes (4 × 3)

USS Davis (DD-65) was a Sampson-class destroyer in commission in the United States Navy from 1916 to 1922. She saw service during World War I. She was the second Navy ship named for Rear Admiral Charles Henry Davis (1807–1877).

After her U.S. Navy service ended, Davis served in the United States Coast Guard as USCGC Davis (CG-21) from 1926 to 1933.

== Construction and commissioning ==
Davis was launched 15 August 1916 by Bath Iron Works, Bath, Maine, sponsored by Miss E. Davis, granddaughter of Admiral Davis; and commissioned 5 October 1916.

== Service history ==
=== World War I ===
Assigned to Destroyer Force, United States Atlantic Fleet, Davis operated on the United States East Coast and in the Caribbean until the United States entered World War I on 6 April 1917. She departed Boston, Massachusetts, on 24 April 1917 as one of six destroyers in the first American destroyer detachment to reach European waters, arriving at Queenstown, Ireland, on 4 May 1917. She performed patrol duty off the coast of Ireland and escorted merchant ship convoys through the zone of greatest danger from Imperial German Navy submarines. Between 25 and 28 June 1917 she met and escorted troop transports carrying the first American Expeditionary Force troops to France.

On 24 February 1918, Davis was proceeding in a scouting line with the destroyers USS Paulding and USS Trippe in the Atlantic Ocean off the south coast of Ireland bound for Queenstown when Paulding sighted the British Royal Navy submarine HMS L2′s periscope. Mistaking L2 for a German U-boat, Paulding headed for the periscope at flank speed and opened gunfire. L2 had sighted the destroyers and, assuming that the destroyers had not seen her periscope, submerged to 90 feet (27 m), but upon hearing Paulding open fire, she dove to 200 feet (61 m). Paulding dropped two depth charges, the first of which shook L2 severely and jammed her diving planes in a hard-upward position. This caused L2 to take on a tremendous inclination, and her stern struck the seabed at a depth of 300 feet (91 m). Four more depth charges exploded, again shaking the submarine. L2′s commanding officer gave the order to blow the number 5 and 6 ballast tanks, and L2 surfaced bow-first. Davis dropped a depth charge near her, and then all three destroyers opened gunfire on her from a range of about 1,500 yards (1,370 m). One round struck L2′s pressure hull just abaft her conning tower. Some of L2's crew emerged from her conning tower, waved their hands and a White Ensign, and fired a smoke grenade. The destroyers ceased fire immediately. L-2 did not sustain serious damage, and Davis escorted her to Berehaven, Ireland. The force commander of British submarines, Captain Martin Dunbar-Nasmith, commended L2 and the destroyers for the action in his report on the friendly fire incident. Admiral Lewis Bayly, the Royal Navy′s Commander-in-Chief, Coast of Ireland, in his endorsement of Nasmith′s report, wrote, "Had L-2 not been very skillfully and coolly handled, she would have been lost. The U. S. destroyers deserve great credit for their smartness in attack, and for their quickness in recognizing the submarine as British."

Davis rescued many survivors of torpedoed vessels, and on 12 May 1918 picked up 35 members of the crew of the German submarine U-103, which had been sunk by the troopship HMT Olympic, turning her prisoners over to British military authorities at Milford Haven, Wales. World War I ended on 11 November 1918, and on 13 December 1918 Davis formed part of the escort force to take the troop transport USS George Washington, with President Woodrow Wilson embarked, into the harbor at Brest, France, then passed in review before Wilson.

Davis returned to New York 7 January 1919 and after an overhaul there joined Division 4, Flotilla 8, Destroyer Force, Atlantic Fleet, to cruise along the U.S. East Coast.

From September 1919 to November 1920 Davis was in reserve at the Philadelphia Navy Yard on League Island in Philadelphia, Pennsylvania. Arriving at Charleston, South Carolina, on 3 December 1920, she operated from Charleston and Newport, Rhode Island, in reduced commission until arriving at the Philadelphia Navy Yard on 29 March 1922. She was decommissioned there 20 June 1922.

=== United States Coast Guard ===
The Navy transferred Davis to the United States Coast Guard on 25 March 1926, and she was commissioned in Coast Guard service as USCGC Davis (CG-21). With her home port at New London, Connecticut, she served as part of the Rum Patrol during Prohibition.

=== Final disposition ===
The Coast Guard returned Davis to the U.S. Navy on 30 June 1933. The Navy retained her in a decommissioned status until she was sold on 22 August 1934.
