= HMS L1 =

Submarine of the Royal Navy

- HMS L1 submarine

History

United Kingdom
- Name: HMS L1
- Builder: Vickers Limited, Barrow-in-Furness
- Laid down: 18 May 1916
- Launched: 10 May 1917
- Commissioned: 10 November 1917
- Fate: Sold for scrapping, March 1930

General characteristics
- Class & type: L-class submarine
- Displacement: 891 long tons (905 t) surfaced; 1,074 long tons (1,091 t) submerged
- Length: 231 ft 1 in (70.4 m)
- Beam: 23 ft 6 in (7.2 m)
- Draught: 13 ft 3 in (4.0 m)
- Installed power: 2,400 bhp (1,800 kW) (diesel); 1,600 hp (1,200 kW) (electric)
- Propulsion: 2 × diesel engines; 2 × electric motors
- Speed: 17 kn (31 km/h; 20 mph) surfaced; 10.5 kn (19.4 km/h; 12.1 mph) submerged
- Range: 3,800 nmi (7,000 km; 4,400 mi) at 10 kn (19 km/h; 12 mph) on the surface
- Test depth: 100 feet (30.5 m)
- Complement: 35
- Armament: 6 × 18 in (457 mm) torpedo tubes (4 bow, 2 beam); 1 × 4 in (102 mm) deck gun

HMS L1 was the lead boat of the L-class submarines built for the Royal Navy during World War I.

== Design and description ==
The L-class boats were enlarged and improved versions of the preceding E class. The submarine had a length of 231 feet 1 inch (70.4 m) overall, a beam of 23 feet 6 inches (7.2 m) and a mean draught of 13 feet 3 inches (4.0 m). They displaced 891 long tons (905 t) on the surface and 1,074 long tons (1,091 t) submerged. The L-class submarines had a crew of 35 officers and ratings.

For surface running, the boats were powered by two 12-cylinder Vickers 1,200-brake-horsepower (895 kW) diesel engines, each driving one propeller shaft. When submerged each propeller was driven by a 600-horsepower (447 kW) electric motor. They could reach 17 knots (31 km/h; 20 mph) on the surface and 10.5 knots (19.4 km/h; 12.1 mph) underwater. On the surface, the L class had a range of 3,200 nautical miles (5,900 km; 3,700 mi) at 10 knots (19 km/h; 12 mph).

The boats were armed with a total of six 18-inch (460 mm) torpedo tubes. Four of these were in the bow and the remaining pair in broadside mounts. They carried 10 reload torpedoes, all for the bow tubes. L1 was initially fitted with a 3-inch (76 mm) anti-aircraft gun, but this was later replaced by a 4-inch (102 mm) deck gun.

== Construction and career ==
Originally laid down by Vickers, Barrow, as E-class submarine E57 on 18 May 1916, she and sister ship E58 incorporated enough changes that they were renamed as the first pair of boats of a newly designated L class. L1 was launched 10 May 1917, and commissioned on 10 November 1917.

She sailed with the Submarine Depot Ship HMS Ambrose (1914) to Hong Kong in 1919 as part of the 4th Submarine Flotilla, arriving there in January 1920. L1 was placed in the reserve flotilla in 1923 in Hong Kong. She was then sold to John Cashmore Ltd in March 1930 for scrapping. While being towed to Newport she broke free and was stranded at Penanwell Cove, near Porth Nanven in Cornwall. She was scrapped where she lay. Some metal remains can still be seen there on low spring tides.
