= HMS L2 =

Submarine of the Royal Navy

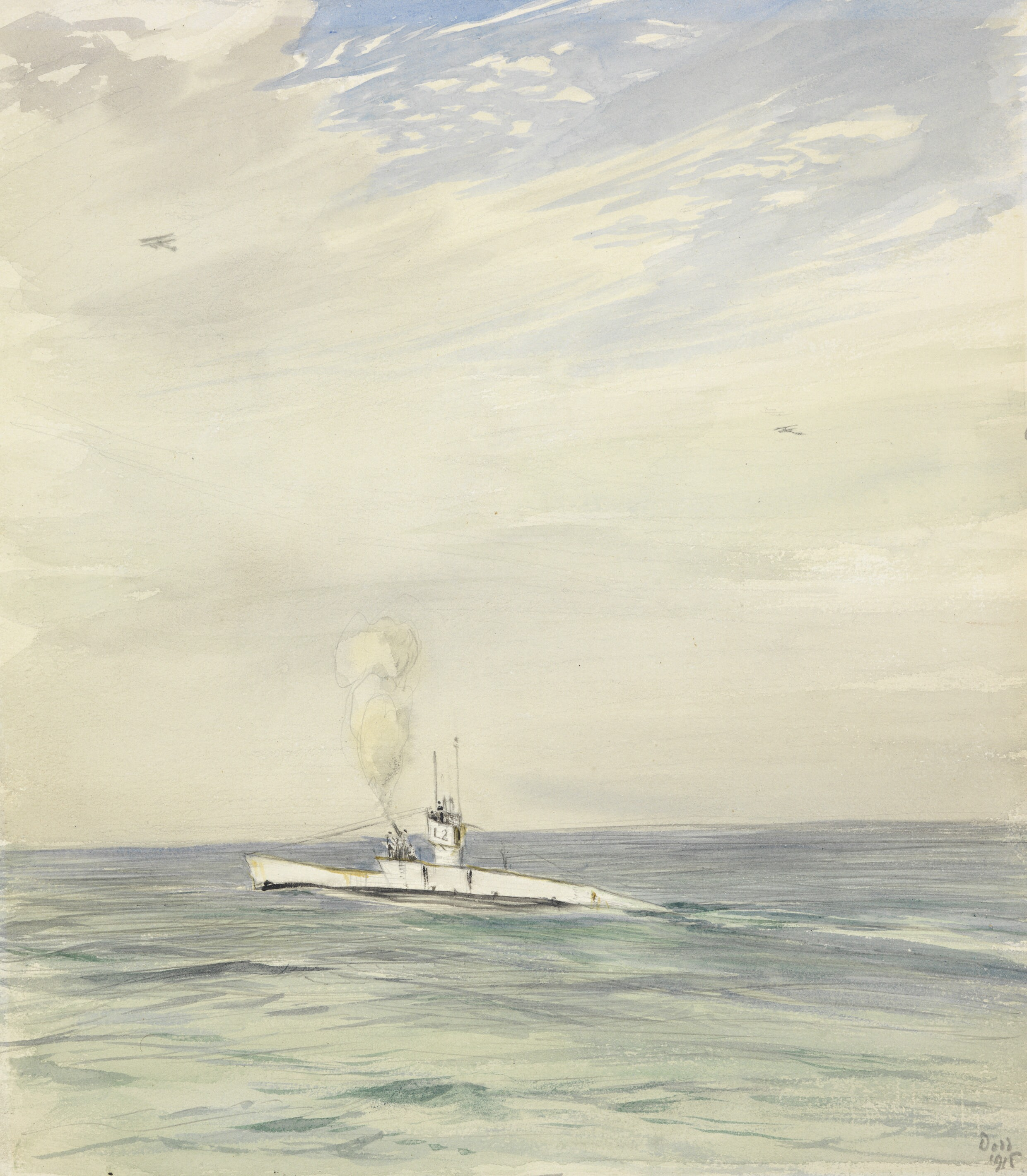
- HMS L2 by Francis Dodd

History

United Kingdom
- Name: HMS L2
- Builder: Vickers Limited, Barrow-in-Furness
- Laid down: 18 May 1916
- Launched: 6 July 1917
- Commissioned: 18 December 1917
- Fate: Sold for scrapping, March 1930

General characteristics
- Class & type: L-class submarine
- Displacement: 891 long tons (905 t) surfaced; 1,074 long tons (1,091 t) submerged
- Length: 231 ft 1 in (70.4 m)
- Beam: 23 ft 6 in (7.2 m)
- Draught: 13 ft 3 in (4.0 m)
- Installed power: 2,400 bhp (1,800 kW) (diesel); 1,600 hp (1,200 kW) (electric)
- Propulsion: 2 × diesel engines; 2 × electric motors
- Speed: 17 kn (31 km/h; 20 mph) surfaced; 10.5 kn (19.4 km/h; 12.1 mph) submerged
- Range: 3,800 nmi (7,000 km; 4,400 mi) at 10 kn (19 km/h; 12 mph) on the surface
- Test depth: 100 feet (30.5 m)
- Complement: 35
- Armament: 6 × 18 in (457 mm) torpedo tubes (4 bow, 2 beam); 1 × 4 in (102 mm) deck gun

HMS L2 was a L-class submarine built for the Royal Navy during World War I.

== Design and description ==
The L-class boats were enlarged and improved versions of the preceding E class. The submarine had a length of 231 feet 1 inch (70.4 m) overall, a beam of 23 feet 6 inches (7.2 m) and a mean draught of 13 feet 3 inches (4.0 m). They displaced 891 long tons (905 t) on the surface and 1,074 long tons (1,091 t) submerged. The L-class submarines had a crew of 35 officers and ratings.

For surface running, the boats were powered by two 12-cylinder Vickers 1,200-brake-horsepower (895 kW) diesel engines, each driving one propeller shaft. When submerged each propeller was driven by a 600-horsepower (447 kW) electric motor. They could reach 17 knots (31 km/h; 20 mph) on the surface and 10.5 knots (19.4 km/h; 12.1 mph) underwater. On the surface, the L class had a range of 3,200 nautical miles (5,900 km; 3,700 mi) at 10 knots (19 km/h; 12 mph).

The boats were armed with a total of six 18-inch (460 mm) torpedo tubes. Four of these were in the bow and the remaining pair in broadside mounts. They carried 10 reload torpedoes, all for the bow tubes. L2 was initially fitted with a 3-inch (76 mm) anti-aircraft gun, but this was later replaced by a 4-inch (102 mm) deck gun.

== Construction and career ==
Originally laid down as E-class submarine E58 on 18 May 1916, she and sister ship E57 incorporated enough changes that they were renamed as the first pair of boats of a newly designated L class. L2 was launched 6 July 1917, and commissioned on 18 December 1917.

During World War I, L2 was on patrol when she became the target of a friendly fire incident involving three United States Navy destroyers. On 24 February 1918, the destroyers USS Davis, USS Paulding, and USS Trippe were proceeding in a scouting line in the Atlantic Ocean off the south coast of Ireland bound for Queenstown, Ireland, when Paulding sighted L2′s periscope. Mistaking L2 for an Imperial German Navy U-boat, Paulding headed for the periscope at flank speed and opened gunfire. L2 had sighted the destroyers and, assuming that the destroyers had not seen her periscope, submerged to 90 feet (27 m), but upon hearing Paulding open fire, she dove to 200 feet (61 m). Paulding dropped two depth charges, the first of which shook L2 severely and jammed her diving planes in a hard-upward position. This caused L2 to take on a tremendous inclination, and her stern struck the seabed at a depth of 300 feet (91 m). Four more depth charges exploded, again shaking the submarine. Her commanding officer, Lieutenant Commander Anworth, gave the order to blow the number 5 and 6 ballast tanks, and L2 surfaced bow-first. Davis dropped a depth charge near her, and then all three destroyers opened gunfire on her from a range of about 1,500 yards (1,370 m). One round struck L2′s pressure hull just abaft her conning tower. Some of L2's crew emerged from her conning tower, waved their hands and a White Ensign, and fired a smoke grenade. The destroyers ceased fire immediately. L-2 did not sustain serious damage, and Davis escorted her to Berehaven, Ireland. The force commander of British submarines, Captain Martin Dunbar-Nasmith, commended L2 and the destroyers for the action in his report on the incident. Admiral Lewis Bayly, the Royal Navy′s Commander-in-Chief, Coast of Ireland, in his endorsement of Nasmith′s report, wrote, "Had L-2 not been very skillfully and coolly handled, she would have been lost. The U. S. destroyers deserve great credit for their smartness in attack, and for their quickness in recognizing the submarine as British."

L2 was assigned to the 4th Submarine Flotilla and HMS Titania in 1919 and proceeded to Hong Kong, arriving on 14 April 1920, She was placed in the Reserve Flotilla in Hong Kong in 1923. She was sold in March 1930, and arrived in April 1930 at Thos. W. Ward, Grays, Essex, England, for breaking-up.
