= Cecil Ponsonby Talbot =

Royal Navy admiral (1884-1970)

Vice-Admiral Sir Cecil Ponsonby Talbot KCB KBE DSO*
- Born: 31 August 1884
- Died: 17 March 1970 (aged 85); Penberth, Cornwall
- Military career
- Allegiance: United Kingdom
- Branch: Royal Navy
- Service years: 1914-1946
- Rank: Vice-Admiral
- Commands: HMS J5; HMS Ambrose; HMS Inconstant; HMS Hermes; HMS Renown
- Conflicts: First World War; Second World War
- Awards: Knight Commander of the Order of the Bath; Knight Commander of the Order of the British Empire; Distinguished Service Order & Bar

Vice-Admiral Sir Cecil Ponsonby Talbot KCB KBE DSO & Bar (31 August 1884 – 17 March 1970) was a senior Royal Navy officer.

== Naval career ==
Born on 31 August 1884 and educated at Bedford School, Talbot served in the Royal Navy during the First World War becoming commanding officer of the submarine HMS J5 in May 1916 and of the former passenger ship HMS Ambrose in September 1918. He was in command of HMS Ambrose at the time of her journey to Hong Kong in 1920. He was appointed Aide-de-camp to King George V and became commanding officer of the cruiser HMS Inconstant in July 1921, of the aircraft carrier HMS Hermes in July 1925 and of the battlecruiser HMS Renown in April 1929. He went on to be Director of Naval Equipment at the Admiralty in 1932 and Rear Admiral, Submarines in 1934.

Talbot became Director of Dockyards at the Admiralty in 1937 and continued in that role throughout Second World War until he retired in 1946. He was invested Knight Commander of the Order of the British Empire (KBE) in the 1939 Birthday Honours and Knight Commander of the Order of the Bath (KCB) in the 1947 Birthday Honours.

There is a memorial window given by him and his wife in the Submariners' chapel, Fort Blockhouse in memory of two of his sons who died in submarines in world war 2 .

He died in Penberth, Cornwall on 17 March 1970.

An account of his life can be seen on the www.maritimequest.com website

== Family ==
In 1912 Talbot married Bridget Bradshaw; they had three sons and one daughter.

Military offices
Preceded by Noel Laurence	Rear-Admiral Submarines; 1934–1936	Succeeded by Robert Raikes
