= HMS Maidstone =

Nine ships of the Royal Navy have borne the name HMS Maidstone, after the English town of Maidstone, or the Battle of Maidstone:

- Maidstone was a 40-gun ship launched for the Commonwealth in 1654. She was renamed Mary Rose at the Restoration of King Charles II in 1660 and was captured in 1691.
- HMS Maidstone (1693) was a 24-gun sixth rate launched in 1693 and sold in 1714.
- HMS Maidstone was a hospital ship, launched as the 48-gun fourth rate HMS Rochester in 1693. She was renamed Maidstone in 1744 on her conversion to a hospital ship and was broken up in 1748.
- HMS Maidstone (1744) was a 50-gun fourth rate launched in 1744 and wrecked in 1747.
- HMS Maidstone (1758) was a 28-gun sixth rate launched in 1758 and broken up in 1794.
- HMS Maidstone (1795) was a 32-gun fifth rate launched in 1795 and broken up in 1810.
- HMS Maidstone (1811) was a 36-gun fifth rate launched in 1811. She was used as a receiving ship from 1832, was hulked in 1839 and broken up in 1865.
- HMS Maidstone (1912) was a depot ship launched in 1912 and sold in 1929.
- HMS Maidstone (1937) was a submarine depot ship launched in 1937. She was used as an accommodation ship and a prison ship and was broken up in 1978.
