= HMS L7 =

History

United Kingdom
- Name: HMS L7
- Builder: Cammell Laird, Birkenhead
- Laid down: May 1916
- Launched: 24 April 1917
- Commissioned: December 1917
- Fate: Sold for scrapping, 26 February 1930

General characteristics
- Class & type: L-class submarine
- Displacement: 891 long tons (905 t) surfaced; 1,074 long tons (1,091 t) submerged
- Length: 231 ft 1 in (70.4 m)
- Beam: 23 ft 6 in (7.2 m)
- Draught: 13 ft 3 in (4.0 m)
- Installed power: 2,400 bhp (1,800 kW) (diesel); 1,600 hp (1,200 kW) (electric)
- Propulsion: 2 × diesel engines; 2 × electric motors
- Speed: 17 kn (31 km/h; 20 mph) surfaced; 10.5 kn (19.4 km/h; 12.1 mph) submerged
- Range: 3,800 nmi (7,000 km; 4,400 mi) at 10 kn (19 km/h; 12 mph) on the surface
- Test depth: 100 feet (30.5 m)
- Complement: 35
- Armament: 6 × 18 in (457 mm) torpedo tubes (4 bow, 2 beam); 1 × 4-inch deck gun

HMS L7 was a L-class submarine built for the Royal Navy during World War I. The boat survived the war and was sold for scrap in 1930.

== Design and description ==
The L-class boats were enlarged and improved versions of the preceding E class. The submarine had a length of 231 feet 1 inch (70.4 m) overall, a beam of 23 feet 6 inches (7.2 m) and a mean draught of 13 feet 3 inches (4.0 m). They displaced 891 long tons (905 t) on the surface and 1,074 long tons (1,091 t) submerged. The L-class submarines had a crew of 35 officers and ratings.

For surface running, the boats were powered by two 12-cylinder Vickers 1,200-brake-horsepower (895 kW) diesel engines, each driving one propeller shaft. When submerged each propeller was driven by a 600-horsepower (447 kW) electric motor. They could reach 17 knots (31 km/h; 20 mph) on the surface and 10.5 knots (19.4 km/h; 12.1 mph) underwater. On the surface, the L class had a range of 3,200 nautical miles (5,900 km; 3,700 mi) at 10 knots (19 km/h; 12 mph).

The boats were armed with a total of six 18-inch (45 cm) torpedo tubes. Four of these were in the bow and the remaining pair in broadside mounts. They carried 10 reload torpedoes, all for the bow tubes. L7 was initially fitted with a 3-inch (76 mm) anti-aircraft gun, but this was later replaced by a 4-inch (102 mm) deck gun.

== Construction and career ==
HMS L7 was built by Cammell Laird, Birkenhead. She was laid down in May 1916 and was commissioned in December 1917. She was based at Falmouth, Cornwall in 1918. She sailed with the Submarine Depot Ship HMS Ambrose to Hong Kong in 1919 as part of the 4th Submarine Flotilla, arriving there in January 1920. L7 was sold to Hughes Bolckow on 26 February 1930 for scrapping at Blyth.
