= HMS L15 =

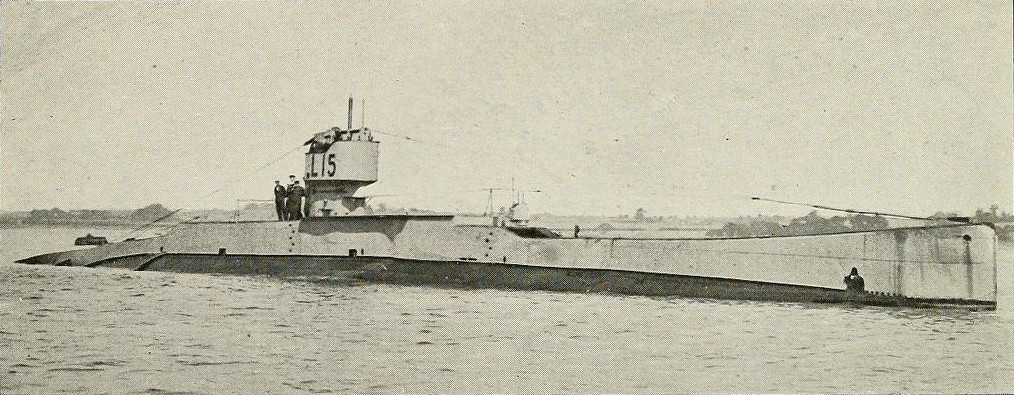
- L15 in 1918

History

United Kingdom
- Name: HMS L15
- Builder: Fairfield Shipbuilding and Engineering Company, Govan
- Laid down: 16 November 1916
- Launched: 16 January 1918
- Fate: Sold for scrapping, February 1932

General characteristics
- Class & type: L-class submarine
- Displacement: 914 long tons (929 t) surfaced; 1,089 long tons (1,106 t) submerged
- Length: 238 ft 7 in (72.7 m)
- Beam: 23 ft 6 in (7.2 m)
- Draught: 13 ft 3 in (4.0 m)
- Installed power: 2,400 bhp (1,800 kW) (diesel); 1,600 hp (1,200 kW) (electric)
- Propulsion: 2 × diesel engines; 2 × electric motors
- Speed: 17 kn (31 km/h; 20 mph) surfaced; 10.5 kn (19.4 km/h; 12.1 mph) submerged
- Range: 3,800 nmi (7,000 km; 4,400 mi) at 10 kn (19 km/h; 12 mph) on the surface
- Test depth: 150 feet (45.7 m)
- Complement: 38
- Armament: 4 × bow 21 in (533 mm) torpedo tubes; 2 × beam 18 in (457 mm) torpedo tubes; 1 × 4-inch deck gun

HMS L15 was a L-class submarine built for the Royal Navy during World War I. The boat survived the war and was sold for scrap in 1932.

== Design and description ==
L9 and its successors were enlarged to accommodate 21-inch (53.3 cm) torpedoes and more fuel. The submarine had a length of 238 feet 7 inches (72.7 m) overall, a beam of 23 feet 6 inches (7.2 m) and a mean draught of 13 feet 3 inches (4.0 m). They displaced 914 long tons (929 t) on the surface and 1,089 long tons (1,106 t) submerged. The L-class submarines had a crew of 38 officers and ratings.

For surface running, the boats were powered by two 12-cylinder Vickers 1,200-brake-horsepower (895 kW) diesel engines, each driving one propeller shaft. When submerged each propeller was driven by a 600-horsepower (447 kW) electric motor. They could reach 17 knots (31 km/h; 20 mph) on the surface and 10.5 knots (19.4 km/h; 12.1 mph) underwater. On the surface, the L class had a range of 3,800 nautical miles (7,000 km; 4,400 mi) at 10 knots (19 km/h; 12 mph).

The boats were armed with four 21-inch torpedo tubes in the bow and two 18-inch (45 cm) in broadside mounts. They carried four reload torpedoes for the 21-inch tubes for a grand total of ten torpedoes of all sizes. They were also armed with a 4-inch (102 mm) deck gun.

== Construction and career ==
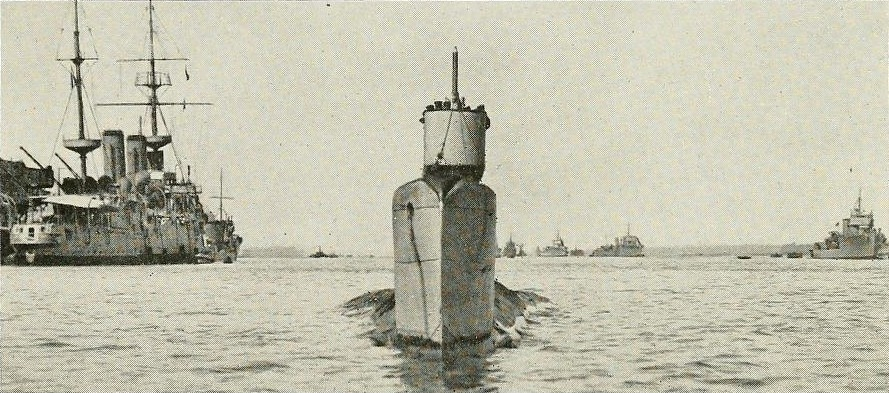
HMS L15 bow view in 1918

HMS L15 was built by Fairfield Shipbuilding and Engineering Company, Govan, Clyde. She was laid down on 16 November 1916 and was commissioned on 16 January 1918. She sailed with the Submarine Depot Ship HMS Ambrose (1914) to Hong Kong in 1919 as part of the 4th Submarine Flotilla, arriving there in January 1920. The boat was sold to John Cashmore Ltd in February 1932 for scrapping at Newport.
