= HMS L27 =

- HMS L27

History

United Kingdom
- Name: HMS L27
- Builder: Vickers Limited, Barrow-in-Furness
- Laid down: 30 January 1918
- Launched: 14 June 1919
- Commissioned: 25 March 1926
- Fate: Broken up, 1946

General characteristics
- Class & type: L-class submarine
- Displacement: 914 long tons (929 t) surfaced; 1,089 long tons (1,106 t) submerged
- Length: 238 ft 7 in (72.7 m)
- Beam: 23 ft 6 in (7.2 m)
- Draught: 13 ft 3 in (4.0 m)
- Installed power: 2,400 bhp (1,800 kW) (diesel); 1,600 hp (1,200 kW) (electric)
- Propulsion: 2 × diesel engines; 2 × electric motors
- Speed: 17 kn (31 km/h; 20 mph) surfaced; 10.5 kn (19.4 km/h; 12.1 mph) submerged
- Range: 3,800 nmi (7,000 km; 4,400 mi) at 10 kn (19 km/h; 12 mph) on the surface
- Test depth: 150 feet (45.7 m)
- Complement: 38
- Armament: 4 × bow 21 in (533 mm) torpedo tubes; 2 × beam 18 in (457 mm) torpedo tubes; 1 × 4-inch deck gun

HMS L27 was a L-class submarine built for the Royal Navy during World War I. The boat was not completed before the end of the war and was one of three L-class boats to serve during World War II. She served as training boat before being broken up in 1944.

== Design and description ==
L9 and its successors were enlarged to accommodate 21-inch (53.3 cm) torpedoes and more fuel. The submarine had a length of 238 feet 7 inches (72.7 m) overall, a beam of 23 feet 6 inches (7.2 m) and a mean draught of 13 feet 3 inches (4.0 m). They displaced 914 long tons (929 t) on the surface and 1,089 long tons (1,106 t) submerged. The L-class submarines had a crew of 35 officers and ratings. They had a diving depth of 150 feet (45.7 m).

For surface running, the boats were powered by two 12-cylinder Vickers 1,200-brake-horsepower (895 kW) diesel engines, each driving one propeller shaft. When submerged each propeller was driven by a 600-horsepower (447 kW) electric motor. They could reach 17 knots (31 km/h; 20 mph) on the surface and 10.5 knots (19.4 km/h; 12.1 mph) underwater. On the surface, the L class had a range of 3,800 nautical miles (7,000 km; 4,400 mi) at 10 knots (19 km/h; 12 mph).

The boats were armed with four 21-inch (533 mm) torpedo tubes in the bow and two 18-inch (460 mm) tubes in broadside mounts. They carried four reload torpedoes for the 21-inch tubes for a grand total of ten torpedoes of all sizes. They were also armed with a 4-inch (102 mm) deck gun.

== Construction and career ==
HMS L27 was built by Vickers at their Barrow-in-Furness shipyard, launched on 14 June 1919. She was then towed and completed at HM Dockyard, Sheerness and commissioned on 25 March 1926.

At the onset of the Second World War, L27 was a member of the 6th Submarine Flotilla. From 26–29 August 1939, the flotilla deployed to its war bases at Dundee and Blyth. From 20 September 1939 to 15 January 1940, the 6th Submarine Flotilla was deployed off Skagerrak, Jutland and Horns Reef. On 15 October 1940 L27 attacked a German convoy unsuccessfully in the English Channel.

Beginning on 22 March 1941, the Royal Navy and Allies began deploying submarines off Brest, France to prevent the German battleships Gneisenau and Scharnhorst from leaving port. L27 was among the submarines assigned to the patrol. On 15 October 1941, the submarine unsuccessfully attacked a merchant vessel off Cherbourg.

L27 was converted into a training boat at Portsmouth before being broken up at Montreal from July 1946.
