= Zalia =

Zalia may refer to:

- Zalia, West Virginia
- Manuel Zelaya (born 1952), Honduran businessman & politician

== See also ==
- Zulia (disambiguation)
