= Maracaibo (disambiguation) =

Maracaibo is a city and municipality in the Zulia State, Venezuela.

Maracaibo can also refer to:

== Geography ==
- Maracaibo Basin
- Maracaibo Metro
- Maracaibo Lake
- Maracaibo Lake (Bolivia)
- Maracaibo Province (disambiguation)

== Other ==
- Maracaibo (film)
