= Maracaibo Province =

Maracaibo Province may refer to:

- Maracaibo Province (Spanish Empire) 1676–1824
- Maracaibo Province (Gran Colombia), Gran Colombia 1824–1830
- Maracaibo Province (Venezuela) 1830–1864
