= D31 =

D31 may refer to:

== Ships ==
- ARV Aragua (D-31), a Nueva Esparta-class destroyer of the Venezuelan Navy
- Brazilian destroyer Piauí (D31), a Pará-class destroyer of the Brazilian Navy
- Greek destroyer Ierax (D31), a Cannon-class destroyer of the Hellenic Navy
- HMAS Voyager (D31), a W-class destroyer of the Royal Australian Navy
- HMS Arbiter (D31), a Ruler-class escort carrier of the Royal Navy
- HMS Broadsword (D31), a Weapon-class destroyer of the Royal Navy
- HMS Vigo (D31), a Battle-class destroyer of the Royal Navy

== Other uses ==
- D31 road (Croatia)
- Dewoitine D.30, a French passenger monoplane
- Druine D.31 Turbulent, a French ultralight aircraft
- LNER Class D31, a class of British steam locomotives
