= Trujillo Province (Venezuela) =

- Coordinates: 9°22′N 70°26′W

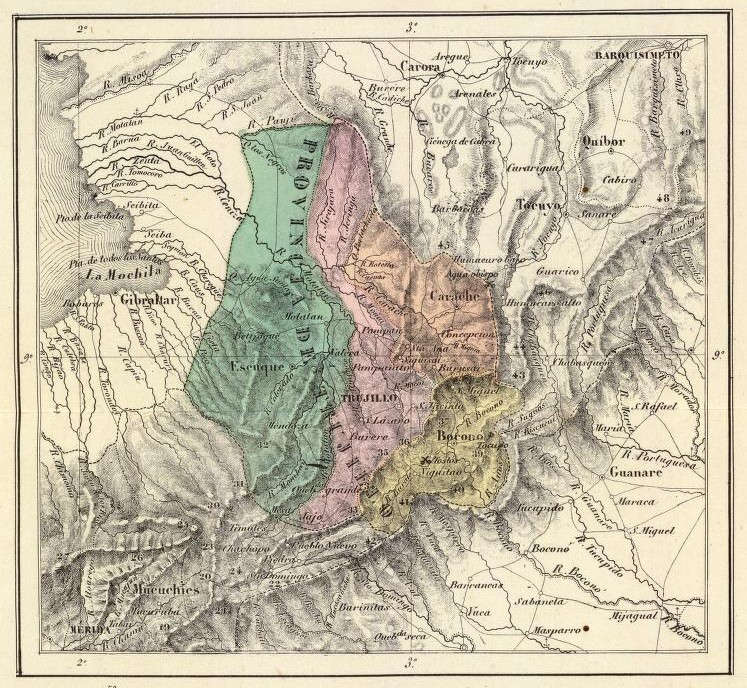
Trujillo Province in 1840.

Trujillo Province (1831–1864) was a province in the Zulia Department of Gran Colombia, and later one of the Provinces of Venezuela, after it split from Maracaibo Province in 1831 following the independence of Venezuela in 1830.

== History ==
It was originally created during the Venezuelan War of Independence from Maracaibo Province, and was reabsorbed by it several times with the fall of independence forces. One of the stars on the Flag of Venezuela represents Trujillo, as a signatory to the declaration of independence. The Province became part of Gran Colombia's Zulia Department in 1819.

In 1864 it became the Venezuelan state of Trujillo.

== Cantons ==
- Trujillo Canton - Trujillo
- Boconó Canton - Boconó
- Escuque Canton - Escuque
- Carache Canton - Carache
