= Zulia (disambiguation) =

Zulia may refer to:

== Places ==
=== Colombia ===
- El Zulia, a municipality in the department of Norte de Santander
- Zulia River, a river on the border with Venezuela

=== Venezuela ===
- Zulia, one of the 23 states which make up the country
- Zulia Canton, a former canton of Gran Colombia
- Zulia Department, a former department of Gran Colombia
- Zulian Region, a development region consisting of the state of Zulia
- Zulia River, a river on the border with Colombia

=== Elsewhere ===
- Mount Zulia, Uganda

== People ==
- Zulia Calatayud (born 1979), Cuban middle-distance runner
- Zulia Menjívar (born 1992), Salvadoran footballer

== Other uses ==
- University of Zulia, Maracaibo, Venezuela
- Diocese of Zulia, a Venezuelan diocese in the Roman Catholic Archdiocese of Maracaibo
- ARV Zulia (D-21), a Venezuelan Navy destroyer
- Zulia Fútbol Club, a Venezuelan football club

== See also ==
- Zulia toad-headed sideneck, a turtle species
- Manuel Zelaya (born 1952), Honduran politician
