= D21 =

D21 may refer to:

== Vehicles ==
=== Aircraft ===
- Dewoitine D.21, a French fighter
- Fokker D.XXI, a Dutch fighter
- Lockheed D-21, an American reconnaissance drone
- Salmson D21 Phrygane, a French utility aircraft

=== Ships ===
- ARV Zulia (D-21), a Nueva Esparta-class destroyer of the Venezuelan Navy
- HMS Norfolk (D21), a County-class destroyer of the Royal Navy
- HMS Quickmatch (D21), a Q-class destroyer of the Royal Navy
- HMS Shah (D21), a Ruler-class escort aircraft carrier of the Royal Navy
- HMS Wryneck (D21), a W-class destroyer of the Royal Navy
- Spanish destroyer Lepanto (D21), a Fletcher-class destroyer of the Spanish Navy

=== Surface vehicles ===
- Allis-Chalmers D21, an American tractor
- Nissan D21, a Nissan Datsun pickup truck
- LNER Class D21, a class of British steam locomotives

== Other uses ==
- Arriflex D-21, a digital motion picture camera
- Chondroma
- D21 road (Croatia)
- D21 – Janeček method, an electoral system
- D21, a computer from Datasaab
- D-21 Special, a guitar made by Martin Guitar
- Democracia 21, a Spanish political party
