= Valencia Metro =

Valencia Metro may refer to:

- Metrovalencia, the rapid transit network for the city of Valencia, Spain and its metropolitan area
- Valencia Metro (Venezuela), the light metro system serving the city of Valencia, Carabobo, Venezuela
