= General Flores =

General Flores may refer to:

- Juan José Flores (1800–1864), Venezuelan general in the patriot army of Simón Bolívar
- Manuel González Flores (1833–1893), Mexican Army general of division
- Venancio Flores (1808–1868), Uruguayan general in the Cruzada Libertadora
- General Flores, a Venezuelan Navy Almirante Clemente-class destroyer

== See also ==
- Manuel Antonio Flórez (1723–1799), Spanish Navy captain general
