= List of Latin American rail transit systems by ridership =

The following is a list of all urban rail transit systems in Latin America, ranked by passenger ridership. These kinds of systems are most commonly known as metro (or subway in English), but may also be known as subte, tren, or tranvía systems. Daily and annual passengers ridership figures in this chart are based on annual and daily (not just weekday) average passenger trips. The year of the source date varies and is provided on the right.

Overall, Brazil has the largest number of metros, with 12 such systems, followed by Venezuela with 4 metro systems. The São Paulo Metro has the highest passenger ridership in Latin America, and second in the Americas, after the New York City Subway.

	System	Country	City served	Annual Ridership*	Average daily boardings*	System length	Ave. daily boardings per km*	Year opened	Stations	Lines	Source date
1	São Paulo Metro	Brazil	São Paulo	1,256,000,000 (Note: Not considering lines 7, 8, 9, 10, 11, 12 and 13. The complete network is 377 km long, has 13 lines, 187 stations, and carries 1,969,400,000 passengers annually.)	3,278,082 (Note: This is the Average Daily Ridership figure, not an Average Weekday Ridership figure - it is averaged from the 2023 Total Ridership figure for this system.)	110.3 km (68.5 mi)	31,520	1974	98	6	2024
2	Mexico City Metro	Mexico	Mexico City	1,171,859,000	3,055,232	200.8 km (124.8 mi) (Note: 200.8 km (124.8 mi) in revenue service; (226.5 km (140.7 mi) considering maintenance tracks), as available in the official website)	15,215	1969	195	12	2024
3	Santiago Metro	Chile	Santiago	661,000,000	1,641,342	148.2 km (92.1 mi)	11,015	1975	143	7	2025
4	Caracas Metro	Venezuela	Caracas	494,987,035	1,356,129	54.1 km (33.6 mi)	25,067	1983	48	4	2023
5	Subte	Argentina	Buenos Aires	345,391,524	946,278	56.7 km (35.2 mi)	16,689	1913	90	6	2023
6	Medellín Metro	Colombia	Medellín	249,975,586	684,865	31.3 km (19.4 mi)	21,881	1995	27	2	2023
7	Lima Metro	Peru	Lima	198,433,434	543,653	39.6 km (24.6 mi)	13,728	2014	31	2	2024
8	MetrôRio	Brazil	Rio de Janeiro	188,900,000	517,534	58 km (36.0 mi)	8,923	1979	41	3	2023
9	Sistema de Tren Eléctrico Urbano	Mexico	Guadalajara	157,704,000	432,117	46.5 km (28.9 mi)	9,293	1989	48	3	2023
10	Monterrey Metro	Mexico	Monterrey	118,036,600	323,388	40.5 km (25.2 mi)	7,985	1991	40	3	2023
11	Panama Metro	Panama	Panama City	116,115,009	318,123	41.5 km (25.8 mi)	10,120	2014	33	2	2026
12	Recife Metro	Brazil	Recife	79,600,000	285,000	44.2 km (27.5 mi)	6,448	1985	30	4	2012
13	Santo Domingo Metro	Dominican Republic	Santo Domingo	76,600,000	275,000	27.4 km (17.0 mi)	5,497	2008	30	2	2017
14	Quito Metro	Ecuador	Quito	73,365,000	201,000	22 km (13.7 mi)	9,136	2023	15	1	2022
15	Trensurb	Brazil	Porto Alegre	62,000,000	170,000	39 km (24.2 mi)	4,359	1985	19	1	2011
16	Belo Horizonte Metro	Brazil	Belo Horizonte	57,419,280	157,300	28.1 km (17.5 mi)	5,598	1986	19	1	2012
17	Federal District Metro	Brazil	Brasília	54,750,000	150,000	42.4 km (26.3 mi)	3,538	2001	24	2	2009
18	Mexico City Light Rail	Mexico	Mexico City	21,000,000	57,534	12.8 km (8.0 mi)	4,495	1986	18	1	2007
19	Valparaíso Metro	Chile	Valparaíso	20,120,000	55,123	43 km (26.7 mi)	1,096	2005	20	1	2013
20	Valencia Metro	Venezuela	Valencia	17,200,000	62,000	6.2 km (3.9 mi)	10,000	2006	7	1	2012
21	Los Teques Metro (Note: The Los Teques Metro is generally considered to be part of the Caracas Metro.)	Venezuela	Los Teques/Caracas	13,000,000	35,616	10.2 km (6.3 mi)	3,490	2006	3	1	08/2013
22	Tren Urbano	United States (Puerto Rico)	San Juan	11,023,500	40,600	17.2 km (10.7 mi)	2,360	2004	16	1	Q4 2012
23	Maracaibo Metro	Venezuela	Maracaibo	9,000,000	42,000	6.5 km (4.0 mi)	3,490	2006	6	1	2011
24	Teresina Metro (Note: Uses diesel rail vehicles, rather than the electrified vehicles used on rapid transit systems.)	Brazil	Teresina	4,300,000	12,000	14.5 km (9.0 mi)	828	1989	9	1	2009
25	Fortaleza Metro	Brazil	Fortaleza	n/a	n/a	43 km (26.7 mi)	n/a	2012	28	2	n/a
26	Metrotranvía Mendoza	Argentina	Mendoza	n/a	n/a	12.5 km (7.8 mi)	n/a	2012	26	1	n/a
27	Salvador Metro	Brazil	Salvador	n/a	400,000	38 km (23.6 mi)	n/a	2014	20	2	n/a
28	Maceió Metro	Brazil	Maceió	n/a	40,000 (Projected)	32 km (19.9 mi)	n/a	1997	n/a	1	2024
29	Cariri Metro	Brazil	Crato–Juazeiro	n/a	5,000	13.9 km (8.6 mi)	360	2009	9	1	n/a

*Corresponds to the ridership source provided for each transit system.

== See also ==
- List of North American light rail systems by ridership
- List of metro systems
- List of tram and light rail transit systems
- List of suburban and commuter rail systems
