= Nueva Esparta-class destroyer =

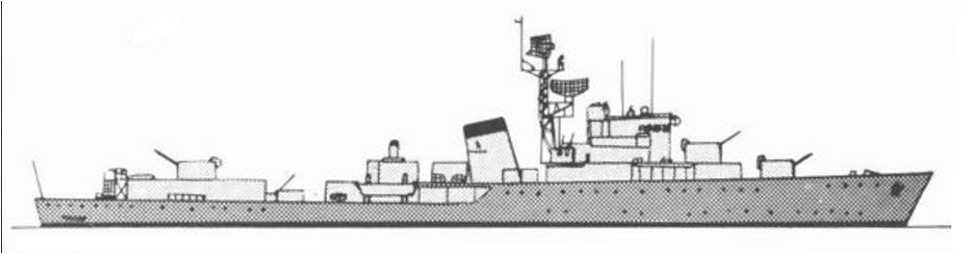
- Aragua

Class overview
- Name: Nueva Esparta class
- Builders: Vickers Armstrongs Shipyards, Barrow-in-Furness
- Operators: Bolivarian Navy of Venezuela
- Built: 1951-1956
- In commission: 1953-1978
- Planned: 3
- Completed: 3
- Retired: 3

General characteristics
- Type: Destroyer
- Displacement: Standard: 2,600 tons; Full load: 3,670 tons
- Length: 402 ft (123 m)
- Beam: 43 ft (13 m)
- Draught: 19 ft (5.8 m)
- Installed power: 2 Foster Wheeler boilers (650 psi, 850 °F); 50,000 shp (37,000 kW)
- Propulsion: Parsons steam turbines
- Speed: 34 knots (63 km/h; 39 mph)
- Range: 10,000 nmi (19,000 km; 12,000 mi) at 10 kn (19 km/h; 12 mph)
- Complement: 18 officers and 236 crew members
- Sensors & processing systems: Radar Type 293Q target indication; Radar Type 291 air warning; Radar Type 274 navigation; Radar Type 275 fire control on director Mk.VI; Radar Type 262 fire control on director CRBF and STAAG Mk.II
- Armament: 6 × QF 4.5 in (114 mm)/45 Mark V guns in 3 twin BD Mark IV mountings; 8 × 40 mm/60 Bofors A/A cannons in 4 twin STAAG Mk.II mounts; 8 × 40 mm/60 Bofors A/A cannons in 4 twin Mk.V mounts; 3 × Torpedo tubes for 21 in (533 mm) Mk.IX torpedoes in 1 triple mount; 1 × 'Squid A/S mortar

The Nueva Esparta-class destroyers were a class of destroyers used by the navy of Venezuela. The lead ship was named after Nueva Esparta (Spanish for "New Sparta"), one of the states of Venezuela.

These ships were ordered in 1950, and were built by the Vickers-Armstrongs shipyards in Barrow-in-Furness between 1951 and 1954.

== History ==
The ships were designed by Vickers-Armstrong shipyards in the 1950s for the Venezuela naval forces. The design has been identified as a derivative of the Batch 3 Battle-class destroyers built for the United Kingdom and Australia, according to information released by the International Naval Research Organization and several independent researchers in 2006. They were to form part of a fleet that included a 25,000 ton aircraft carrier and a Tiger-class cruiser.

The fleet arrangement for 30/04/1949 covers:

- 1 (25,000-ton) aircraft carrier (conceptual engineering)
- 1 (8,000-ton) cruiser (detailed engineering)
- 3 Nueva Esparta-class destroyers (built)
- 6 Alimirante Celemente-class destroyer escorts (built)
- 4 submarines (1 used from US Navy)
- 12 patrol boats (detailed engineering)
- 2 minesweepers (basic engineering)
- 1 marine assault ship (built)

The names assigned to these ships were associated with states in Venezuela.

- Nueva Esparta refers to bravery and loyalty.
- Zulia to remember the Battle of Lake Maracaibo in the Venezuelan War of Independence and the huge contribution of this state to that conflict.
- Aragua because this state is the military heart of Venezuela, and as homage to the La Victoria battle remembered on "Youth Day".

== Ships ==
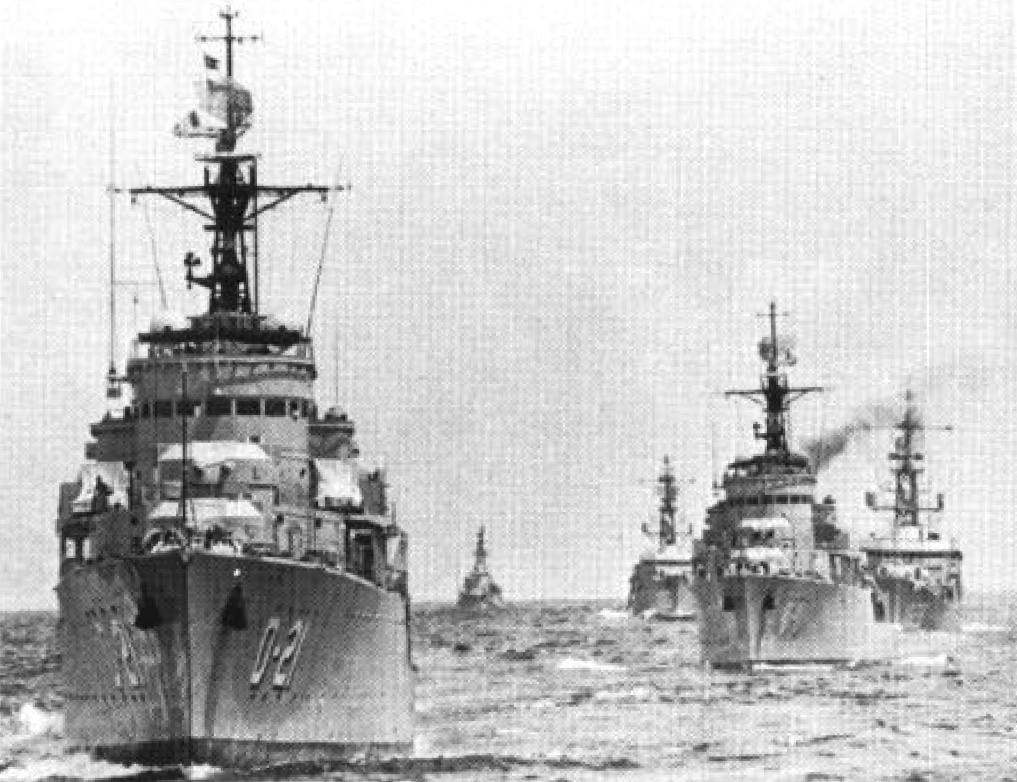
Two Nueva Esparta-class destroyers during the UNITAS X exercise in 1969.

Code	Name	Shipyard ID.	Keel date	Launch date	Commissioned	Repair	Weapons refit	Major maint	Status	Decommissioned	Life cycle
D11	Nueva Esparta	1009	24/07/1951	19/11/1952	08/12/1953	1959	1960	1968/69	Sunk	1978	25,08
D21	Zulia	1010	24/07/1951	29/06/1953	14/02/1956	1959	1960	N/A	Floating museum - sunk	1983	29,32
D31	Aragua	1036	29/06/1953	27/01/1955	14/02/1956	1959	N/A	N/A	Sunk	1975	19,89

=== Sensors and EW ===
Model	Max range	Abilities	Notes
FH-4	500	Surface and aerial search, bearing, and classification data	Passive RWR/ESM/SIGINT
Tipo 162	1	Search, bearing, and range data	Active sonar
Type 170	3	Search, bearing & range data	Active sonar
Type 177	3	Search, bearing & range data	Active/passive radar
Type 275 fc	16	Surface & aerial search in surface, bearing and classification, range & altitude data	Radar
Type 293	45	Surface & aerial search in surface, bearing and range data, IFF	Radar
Type 974	25	Surface & aerial search in surface, bearing and range data	Radar

=== Armament ===
Mount	Rate of Fire	Capacity	Weapons per mount
8 x twin mounting 40mm L/60 Bofors	120	800	16 x 40mm/60 twin double Bofors (max 16)
2 x Mark 4 Squid	180	3	3 x MK4 Squid (max 3)
3 x 4.5 inch (113 mm) L/45 Vickers Mark V in BD Mark IV twin mounting	18	900	3 x 114mm/45 Vickers MK IV Twin (max 6)

=== Magazines ===
Magazines	Rate of Fire	Armor	Capacity	Stores
4.5 in (114 mm)	18	Light	900	900
MK4 Squid	15	None	20	20
40mm	120	None	800	800

=== Communications and datalinks ===
Name	Type	Range	Channels	Description
HF	Radio	300	10	HF secure
VHF	Radio	100	10	VHF secure
UHF	Radio	100	10	UHF secure
HF	Radio	300	10	HF plain
VHF	Radio	100	10	VHF plain
UHF	Radio	100	10	UHF plain

=== Sensor signatures ===
Signature Type	Front	Side	Rear
Passive sonar	95	96	97
Active sonar	16	27	17
Visual	110	151	110
IR	—12	67	18
Radar	71	140	71

== Service ==
One ship was assigned to each destroyer division along with two Almirante Clemente-class destroyers; Nueva Esparta went to the first division, Zulia to the second and Aragua to the third.

== Bibliography ==
- Caruana, J.; Freivogel, Zvonimir; Grobmeier, A. H.; Johnson, Erik C.; Viglietti, Brian (2005). "Question 6/04: Venezuelan Neuva Esparta Class Destroyers". Warship International. XLII (1): 23–24. ISSN 0043-0374.
- Johnson, Erik C. (2006). "Question 6/04: Venezuelan Nueva Esparta Clas Destroyers". Warship International. XLIII (1): 35–36. ISSN 0043-0374.
