= Los Teques Metro =

Venezuelan suburban mass transit system

Overview
- Owner: Venezuelan government
- Locale: Los Teques, Miranda, Venezuela
- Transit type: Light metro
- Number of lines: 1 (branded as 2 lines)
- Number of stations: 5
- Daily ridership: 20,000 (approx. daily average)

Operation
- Began operation: November 3, 2006
- Operator: Metro de Caracas
- Number of vehicles: 22 trains (each train is composed of 6 cars)

Technical
- System length: 11.2 km (7.0 mi)
- Track gauge: 1,435 mm (4 ft 8 1/2 in) (standard gauge)
System map

The Los Teques Metro is a suburban mass-transit system in the city of Los Teques, Venezuela with connections to important surrounding cities and communities. It was opened to public service on November 3, 2006.

The system connects the city of Los Teques with the capital city of Caracas. The Los Teques Metro is operated by Metro de Caracas – as such, it is effectively a subsidiary/extension of the Caracas Metro, and is widely viewed as part of that system. It is ascribed to the Venezuelan government and the Ministry of Infrastructure. The government of Miranda State and the mayorship of the Guaicaipuro Municipality are also financing its development.

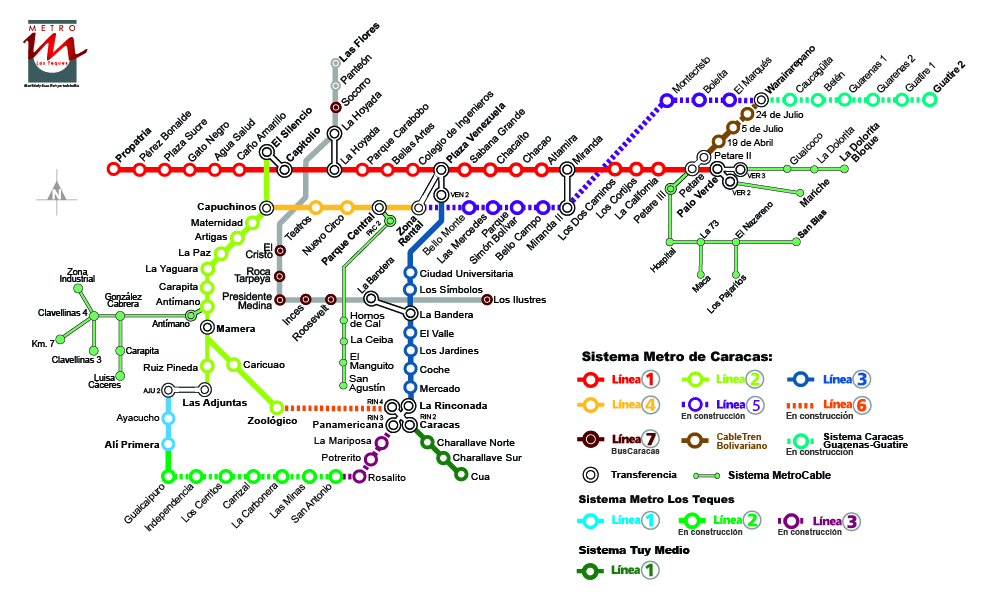
The New Line 2-3 Project

The currently operating line runs for 11.2 kilometers (7.0 mi), parallel to the San Pedro River, establishing a link between Las Adjuntas and Independencia Station.

== History ==
The subway plans date back to 1982 when it was first proposed. However, it wouldn't be until October 19, 1998 when the Metro de Los Teques transit corporation was created (now defunct) in order to carry out management, administrative duties and civil works related to the project. It was supposed to alleviate the congestion of the Panamerican Highway and ease commuting between the two cities, because of their proximity. The operation was subsequently taken over by Metro de Caracas and plans were extended to include expansion to San Antonio and a 3rd line to connect to 2nd point in Caracas.

Construction for the first phase began in 2001 with works including the canalization of the San Pedro River, the tunneling and building of the bridges until reaching Las Adjuntas. It is estimated that the project cost was about 800 million US dollars.

The metro system began with restricted operations:

- 2 railways through a single tunnel;
- 2 or 3 trains;
- Daily service between 5:20 a.m and 11:00 p.m

== Operations ==
The second rail within the same tunnel was formally inaugurated October 22, 2007. Trial and testing period continued with additional trains and full 7 day service from 5:10 a.m. until 11:00 p.m. implemented on November 19, 2007.

The 9.5-kilometer (5.9 mi) ride between Las Adjuntas and Independencia as of July 5, 2015 is 4,00 bolívares Bs.F for a one way ride and the price includes a subway ride within the Caracas Metro network. Los Teques Metro was provided with an integrated operation control centre, command and communications by Thales.

	Type	Coverage	Fare	Notes
Subway	One Way	One ride to or from Los Teques to any Caracas Metro station	4,00 Bolivares Bs.F	Valid for all Caracas Metro stations
Subway	Return Trip	2 rides	8,00 Bolivares Bs.F	same as above
Subway	Multi-Abono Integrad	10 rides	40,00 Bolivares Bs.F	Available at all Caracas Metro stations
Subway	Student Multi-Abono	10 rides	20,00 Bolivares Bs.F	Available at some Caracas Metro stations: Maternidad; Caño Amarillo; Parque del Este; El Silencio and Caricuao.

== Future plans ==
Construction of the extension formally started March 20, 2007. This extension known as Line 2 to the system will be 12 km (7.5 mi) with 3 new stations within the city, 2 in nearby communities and finally terminating in San Antonio de Los Altos with the central Los Teques stations.

Line 4 adds four stations that are currently under construction are:

- Los Cerritos, inauguration TBA
- Carrizal, inauguration TBA
- Las Minas, inauguration TBA
- San Antonio, inauguration TBA

Line 3 has been proposed 18.5 km (11.5 mi). It will commence from San Antonio and connect some communities before looping towards the La Rinconada Caracas Metro Station.

- La Morita
- San Diego
- Potrerito
- La Mariposa
- La Rinconada

=== Timeline of line extensions ===
Line	Station	Station	Length	Status
1	Las Adjuntas	Ayacucho	8.1 km	opened, on October 7, 2015
1	Las Adjuntas	Alí Primera	9.5 km	In everyday service, since November 3, 2006
2	Alí Primera	Guaicaipuro	0.7 km	opened on December 11, 2012
2	Guaicaipuro	Independencia	1.0 km	opened on December 1, 2013
2	Independencia	Los Cerritos	1.7 km	under construction, for service TBA
2	Los Cerritos	Carrizal	1.7 km	under construction, for service TBA
2	Carrizal	La Carbonera	-.- km	under construction, for service TBA
2	Carrizal	Las Minas	4.3 km	under construction, for service TBA
2	Las Minas	San Antonio	2.5 km	under construction, for service TBA
3	San Antonio	La Morita	1.5 km	under construction, for service TBA
3	La Morita	San Diego	1.6 km	under construction, for service TBA
3	San Diego	Potrerito	4.9 km	under construction, for service TBA
3	Potrerito	La Mariposa	3.0 km	under construction, for service TBA
3	La Mariposa	Panamericana	7.5 km	under construction, for service TBA

== See also ==
- Caracas Metro
- Maracaibo Metro
- Valencia Metro
- List of rapid transit systems
- Transportation in Venezuela
- IAFE Venezuelan National Railway
