= Maracaibo Province (Gran Colombia) =

Province of Gran Colombia (1824–1830)

Maracaibo Province was a province of the 1824 created Zulia Department of Gran Colombia. The capital was Maracaibo.

The Zulia Department was a successor of the Maracaibo Province (Spanish Empire).

1830 it became Maracaibo Province (Venezuela).

== Cantons ==
- Maracaibo
- Gibraltar
- Altagracia
- Zulia cabecera San Carlos de Zulia
- Perijá cabecera Rosario de Perijá

== See also ==
- Maracaibo Province (Spanish Empire)
- Maracaibo Province (Venezuela)
