= Almirante Clemente-class destroyer =

Class of ships

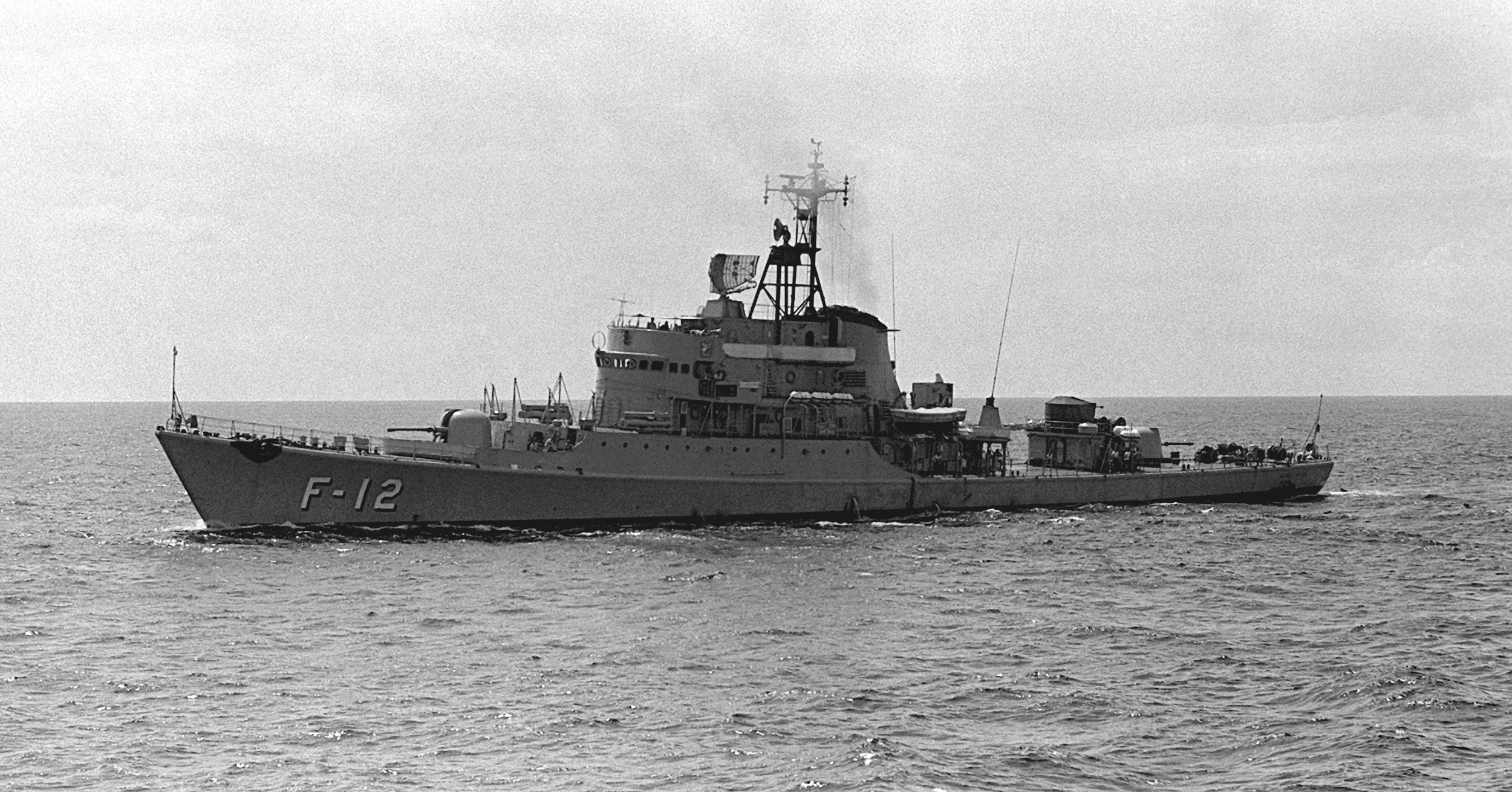
- Venezuelan frigate General Moran (F-12)

Class overview
- Name: Almirante Clemente class
- Builders: Ansaldo Stabilimento Luigi Orlando, Livorno
- Operators: Bolivarian Navy of Venezuela; Indonesian Navy; Portuguese Navy
- Preceded by: Captain class
- Completed: 9
- Retired: 9
- Preserved: 1

General characteristics
- Type: Destroyer escort
- Displacement: Standard: 1,300 tons; Full load: 1,500 tons
- Length: 99.1 m (325 ft)
- Beam: 10.8 m (35 ft)
- Draught: 3.7 m (12 ft)
- Propulsion: 2 Foster Wheeler boilers 650 psi (4.5 MPa), 850 °F (454 °C)), Parsons steam turbines, 2 shafts, 24,000 horsepower (18 MW)
- Speed: 32 knots (59 km/h)
- Range: 3,500 nmi (6,500 km) at 10 knots (19 km/h)
- Complement: 162
- Sensors & processing systems: AN/SPS-6 air search radar; AN/SPS-10 surface search radar; AN/SPG-34 fire control radar; AN/SQS-4 sonar
- Armament: 4 × OTO Melara 102mm/46 guns in 2 twin turrets; 4 × 40 mm/60 Bofors A/A cannons in 2 twin Mark 2 mounts; 8 × 20 mm/70 Oerlikon A/A cannons in 4 twin Mark 24 mounts; 3 × Torpedo tubes for 21 in (533 mm) torpedoes in 1 triple mount; 2 × 'Hedgehog A/S mortar

The Almirante Clemente class of destroyer escorts were a class of warships built for several countries. The class was designed by Ansaldo for the Venezuelan Naval Forces, later the Venezuelan Navy, in the 1950s to complement its Nueva Esparta-class destroyer.

The Venezuelan Navy ordered six ships, Indonesia two, and Portugal one. In the Portuguese Navy, these ships were referred as patrol boats. In the 1950s Venezuelan Navy, the ships were classified as DLV (Destroyer Light Vessel) or light destroyers; in the 1980s they were reclassified as ASW frigate, and were later classified as coast guard vessels.

== Technical specifications ==
These ships included these notable characteristics:

- Alumite superstructure.
- Air conditioned in all areas.
- Retractable Denny-Brown fin stabilisers
- Unique OTO-Melara 102mm gun used only on this class

The usage of the fin stabilizer is a weapons systems support device to stabilize the ship making it a more steady gun platform in rough seas. This can be tracked to HMS Bittern, most of the Hunt-class destroyers after refit have it, but the very first Battle-class destroyers HMS Finisterre and HMS Camperdown have it, even ships as HMS Amethyst have it, but do not use form higher consumption of power, according to several conversations lines in the Maritime History forum MARHST in the US navy ships as USS Gyatt (DD-712) have it.

== Venezuelan Navy ==
=== Ships ===
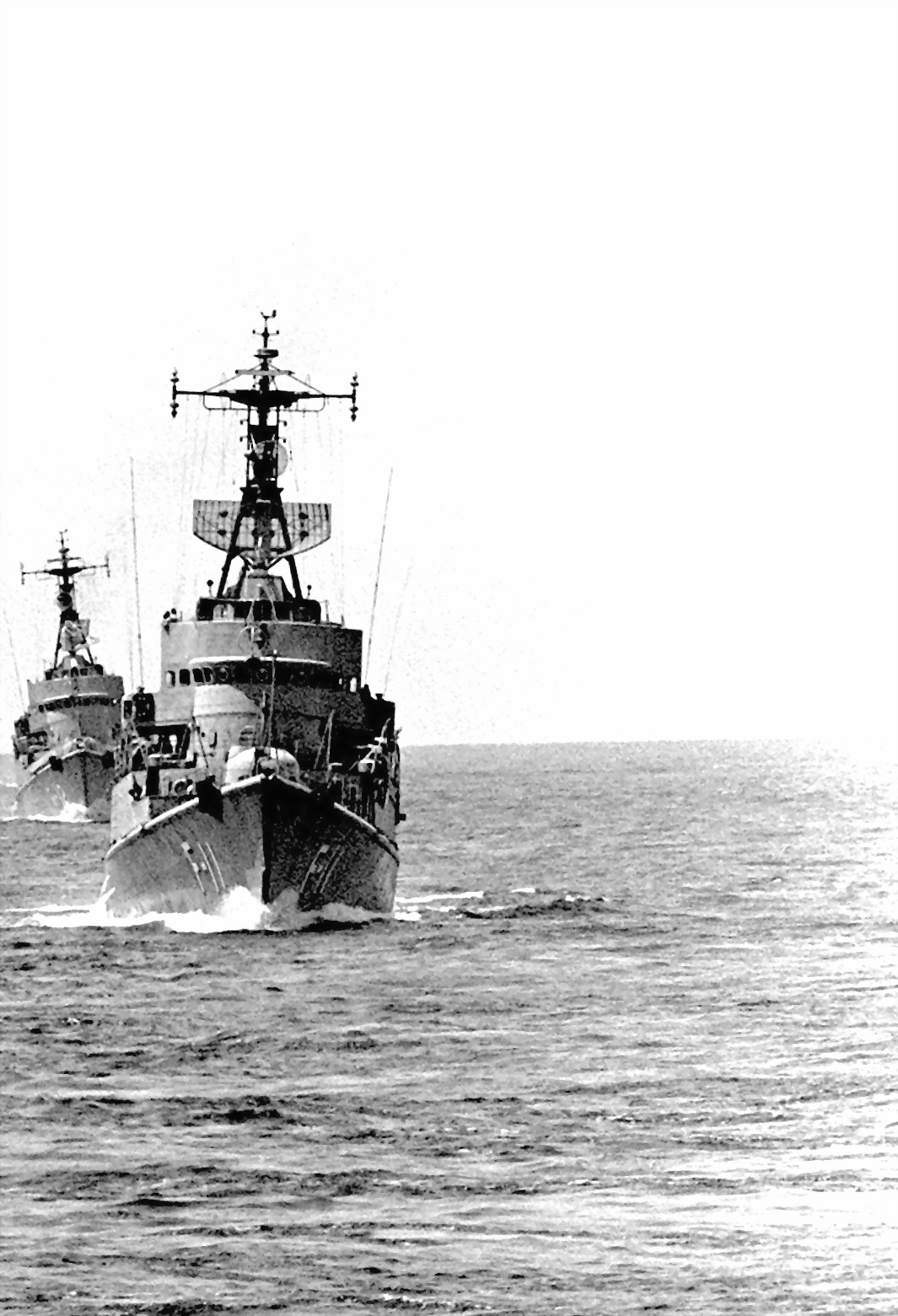
Almirante Clemente (F-11) and General Moran (F-12) during UNITAS XX

The construction contracts for these destroyers were awarded on 25 January 1954, and their names were an homage to Venezuelan War of Independence fighters who lie at Panteón Nacional:

- D-12 Almirante Clemente, named after Lino de Clemente, an officer of the Spanish and Venezuelan navies and prominent politician in early Venezuela. Sunk in 2009.
- D-13 General Flores, named after Juan José Flores, Venezuelan soldier, as well as the first president of Ecuador. Sunk in 1978.
- D-22 General Moran, named after José Trinidad Moran, a soldier who fought with Simón Bolívar's independence movement. transferred to Coast Guard. Ship has been removed from service and partially been dismantled as of 2011.
- D-23 Almirante Brión, named after Luis Brión, an admiral in Bolivar's navy. Sunk in 1978.
- D-32 General Austria, named after José de Austria, a general under Francisco de Miranda's command. Sunk in 1976.
- D-33 Almirante Garcia, named after José María García, a naval officer under Juan Bautista Arismendi. Sunk in 1977.

=== Fleet Arrangement ===
- First Division
  - D11 Nueva Esparta (Nueva Esparta class)
  - D12 Almirante Clemente (Almirante Clemente class)
  - D13 General Flores (Almirante Clemente class)
- Second Division
  - D21 Zulia (Nueva Esparta class)
  - D22 General Moran (Almirante Clemente class)
  - D23 Almirante Brión (Almirante Clemente class)
- Third Division
  - D31 Aragua (Nueva Esparta class)
  - D32 General Austria (Almirante Clemente class)
  - D33 Almirante Garcia (Almirante Clemente class)

== Indonesian Navy ==
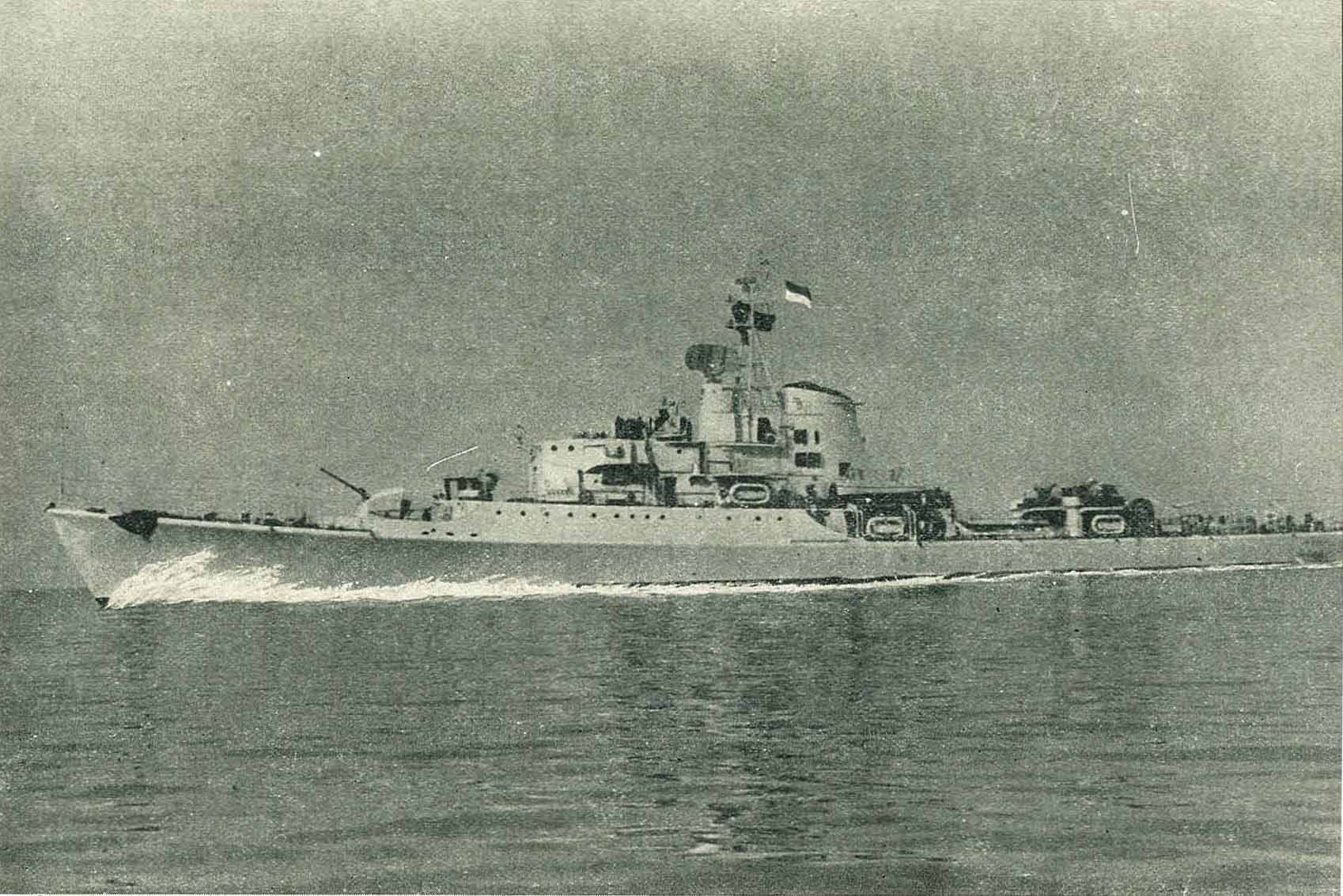
An Indonesian Almirante Clemente class in late 1950s

Two destroyer escorts of similar design was built for Indonesian Navy by Ansaldo. Both were completed in May 1958. They were never modernized and was stricken in 1978. In comparison with its Venezuelan sisters, the Indonesian ships had lighter anti-aircraft armaments which consisted of three 20 mm in twin mounts. They were named after National Hero of Indonesia:

- Imam Bondjol (250), named after Tuanku Imam Bonjol, an Islamic figure from West Sumatra who fought against Dutch colonial forces in the Padri War. Its pennant number was later changed to 355.
- Surapati (251), named after Untung Surapati, a Balinese war fighter who led several rebellions against the Dutch East India Company. Its pennant number was later changed to 356.

== Ships in class ==
=== Venezuelan Navy ===
Name	Hull No.	Shipyard ID	Laid down	Launched	Commissioned	AA & ASW Refit	Weapons Refit	Coast Guard	Major maint.	Status	Decommissioned	Life Cycle
Almirante Clemente	D12	1491	5 May 1954	12 December 1954	4 April 1956	N/A	1968/75	1984/85	1986	Dismantled	2011	>51,22
General Flores	D13	1493	5 May 1954	12 December 1954	1956	N/A	1968/75	N/A	N/A	Sunk	1978	22
General Moran	D22	1492	5 May 1954	12 December 1954	10 January 1957	N/A	1968/75	1984/85	1986	Dismantled	2009	>51,12
Almirante Brión	D23	1496	12 December 1954	4 September 1955	1957	1962	N/A	N/A	N/A	Sunk	1978	22
General Austria	D32	1497	12 December 1954	4 September 1956	1957	1962	N/A	N/A	N/A	Sunk	1976	20
Almirante García	D33	1498	12 December 1954	12 October 1956	1957	1962	N/A	N/A	N/A	Sunk	1977	21

=== Indonesian Navy ===
Name	Pennant No.	Laid down	Launched	Completed	Decommissioned
Imam Bondjol	250 / 355	8 January 1956	5 May 1956	19 May 1958	1978
Surapati	251 / 356	8 January 1956	5 May 1956	28 May 1958	1978

== See also ==
Equivalent destroyers of the same era

- St. Laurent class
- Neustrashimy class
- Holland class
- Ayanami class
- Östergötland class
- Restigouche class
- Skory class
