= Zalia, West Virginia =

- Unincorporated community
- Location within West Virginia Location within the United States
- Coordinates: 40°27′44″N 80°35′38″W
- Country: United States
- State: West Virginia
- County: Hancock
- Elevation: 686 ft (209 m)
- Time zone: UTC-5 (Eastern (EST))
  - Summer (DST): UTC-4 (EDT)
- GNIS ID: 1558250

Zalia is an unincorporated community in Hancock County, West Virginia, United States. It was also known as Brickyard Bend.
