= ARV Zulia =

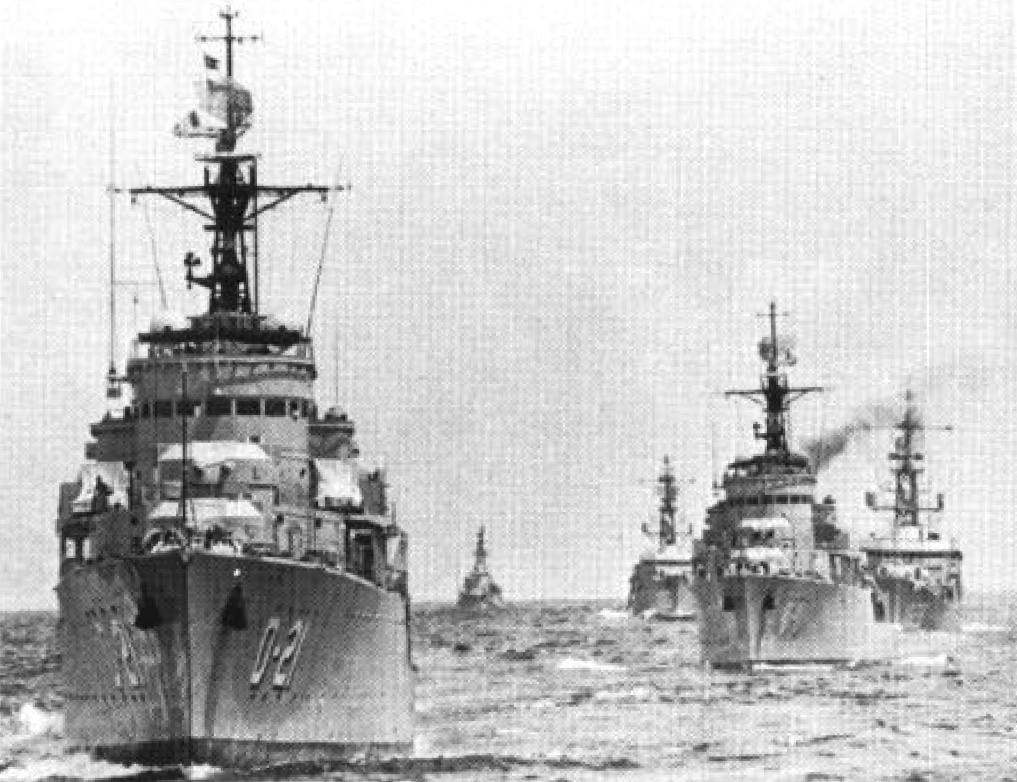
- ARV Zulia (D-21) in 1969

History

Venezuela
- Name: ARV Zulia
- Namesake: Zulia
- Ordered: 1950
- Builder: Vickers Armstrongs Shipyards Barrow in Furness
- Identification: D-21

General characteristics
- Class & type: Nueva Esparta-class destroyer
- Displacement: Standard: 2,600 tons; Full load: 3,670 tons
- Length: 402 ft (122,5 m)
- Beam: 43 ft (13 m)
- Draught: 19 ft (5.8 m)
- Propulsion: 2 Foster Wheeler boilers (650 psi, 850 °F), Parsons steam turbines, 50,000 shp
- Speed: 34 kn ( km/h)
- Range: 10,000 nmi at 10 kn, 1 month
- Complement: 18 officers and 236 crew members
- Sensors & processing systems: Radar Type 293Q target indication; Radar Type 291 air warning; Radar Type 274 navigation; Radar Type 275 fire control on director Mk.VI; Radar Type 262 fire control on director CRBF and STAAG Mk.II
- Armament: 6 × QF 4.5 in /45 (114 mm) Mark V in 3 twin mountings UD Mark VI; 4 × 40 mm /60 Bofors A/A in 2 twin mounts STAAG Mk.II; 2 × 40 mm /60 Bofors A/A in 1 twin mount Mk.V; 2 × Torpedo tubes for 21 in (533 mm) torpedoes Mk.IX; 1 × 'Squid A/S mortar

Zulia was one of three Nueva Esparta-class destroyers of the Venezuelan Navy. Named for the Venezuelan state of Zulia, it was built by the British shipyard Vickers Armstrong in the 1950s. It served as the leader of the 2nd Destroyer Division, and remained in service until 1978.

== Design and description ==
In 1950, the Venezuelan Navy placed an order for two large destroyers, Nueva Esparta and Zulia, with the British shipbuilding company Vickers Armstrong, with an order for a third ship, Aragua, following later. The ships was of similar size and layout to the British Daring-class destroyers, but carried the same gun mounts as the older and smaller Battle class, and was often compared with the Battles.

The ships were 122.5 m (402 ft) long overall and 117.0 m (384 ft) between perpendiculars, with a beam of 13.1 m (43 ft) and a draught of 3.89 metres (12 ft 9 in). Displacement was 2,600 long tons (2,600 t) standard and 3,300 long tons (3,400 t) full load. Two Yarrow boilers fed steam at 2,800 kilopascals (400 psi) to Parsons geared steam turbines, which drove two propeller shafts. The machinery, arranged on the 'unit' principle, where boiler rooms and engine rooms alternated to increase survivability, was rated at 50,000 shaft horsepower (37,000 kW), giving a speed of 34.5 knots (63.9 km/h; 39.7 mph). The conservative machinery (the Darings boilers produced steam at a pressure of 650 pounds per square inch (4,500 kPa)) gave a range of 4,000 nautical miles (7,400 km; 4,600 mi), less than a Daring despite carrying more fuel.

Main gun armament consisted of three twin QF Mark IV 4.5 in (110 mm) mounts, with two forward and one mount aft, with a close-in armament of 16 40mm Bofors guns in eight twin mounts. Torpedo armament consisted of a single triple mount for 21-inch (533 mm) torpedoes, while 30 depth charges could be carried. The ship had a crew of 18 officers and 236 other ranks.

== Construction and career ==
Zulia was laid down at Vickers Armstrong's Barrow-in-Furness shipyard on 24 July 1951, was launched on 29 June 1952 and completed on 15 September 1954. Zulia was refitted at Vickers Armstrong's Hebburn shipyard in 1959, where the ship's torpedo tubes were removed to accommodate two Squid anti-submarine mortars. In 1960, the ship was fitted with modernised electronics at the New York Navy Yard.
