= Valencia Metro (Venezuela) =

Public Transit system in Valencia, Venezuela

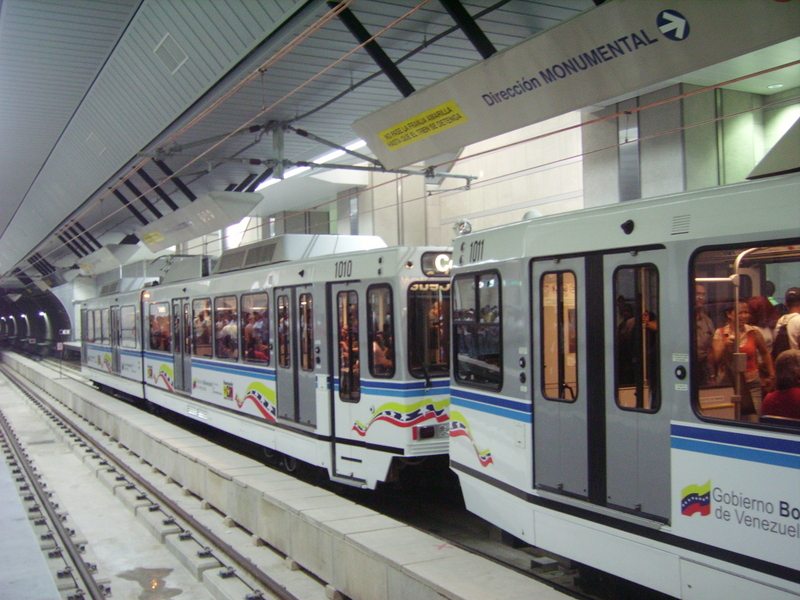
- Coupled Siemens vehicles

Overview
- Locale: Valencia, Carabobo, Venezuela
- Transit type: Rapid transit/Light metro
- Number of lines: 1 (with more planned)
- Number of stations: 7
- Daily ridership: 62,000 (2011)
- Website: Metro Valencia C.A.

Operation
- Began operation: 18 November 2007; 19 years ago
- Number of vehicles: 12 Siemens SD-460; 2-car trainsets

Technical
- System length: 7.7 km (4.8 mi)

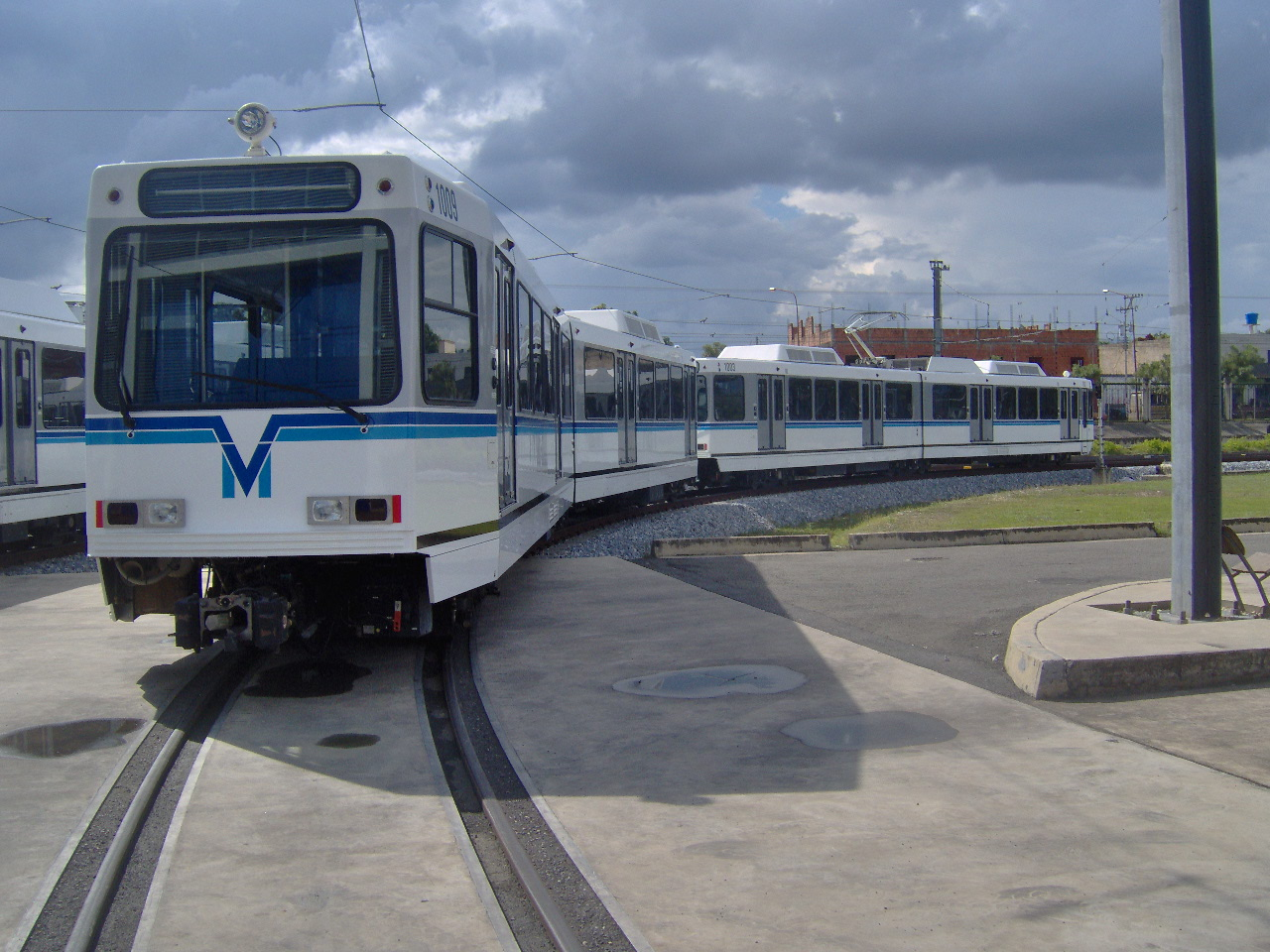
A vehicle at the maintenance facility

The Valencia Metro (Spanish: Metro Valencia or Metro de Valencia) is the public mass transit system of Valencia, Carabobo, Venezuela and its suburbs Naguanagua Municipality and San Diego Municipality.

== Operations ==
The metro system was officially opened to the public on 18 November 2006 with just 3 of 7 stations along the original 4.7-kilometer (2.9 mi) Line 1 route open for service, and operating for limited hours while providing service free of charge. Normal revenue service with all 7 stations along Line 1 began 18 November 2007.

Although the fleet comprises twelve Siemens SD-460 2-car light rail vehicle trainsets, the Valencia system is a light metro, running on a completely grade-separated route (other than within its own maintenance yard) that does not share space with any other traffic.

Valencia Metro operates Monday-Friday from 6am to 8:30pm; Saturday, Sunday and holidays from 6:00am to 7:30pm. An adult fare of 0.5 BsF (23 US cents) and a student fare of 0.15 BsF (7 US Cents) is charged to ride the metro. An average of 62,000 passengers are transported daily.

== Lines ==
Currently the Valencia Metro operates Line 1 for service.

=== Future ===
==== Extension of the existing north-south route - Lines 2 & 3 ====
A further 4.3-kilometer (2.7 mi) section (Line 2) of the same north-south route as Line 1 is under construction, and a third 5.6-kilometer (3.5 mi) section (Line 3) in the engineering and environmental impact phases. Thus, of the full 14.6-kilometer (9.1 mi) north-south route, only 4.7 kilometers (2.9 mi) are currently in service, with the remaining 9.9 kilometers (6.2 mi) still under construction or in development. Not every segment of construction on this route is an independent "line." When the system is fully completed, it will form a single continuous route, with no transfers necessary to complete a trip along the route.

==== Line 4 ====
A separate 18.2-kilometer (11.3 mi) east-west Line 4 will connect mainly the Valencia Municipality with San Diego Municipality of the same city, and it is in the preliminary planning stage.

== See also ==
- Caracas Metro
- Los Teques Metro
- Maracaibo Metro
- IAFE Venezuelan National Railway
- List of Latin American rail transit systems by ridership
- Light metro
- List of tram and light rail transit systems
- List of metro systems
