= Zulia Canton =

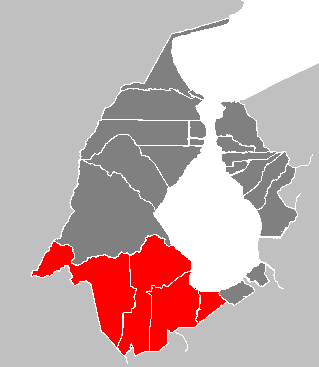

Zulia Canton (Spanish: Cantón Zulia) was a canton in Maracaibo Province, Zulia Department, Gran Colombia, now in Venezuela.
