= Light metro =

Rail transport system with moderate capacity

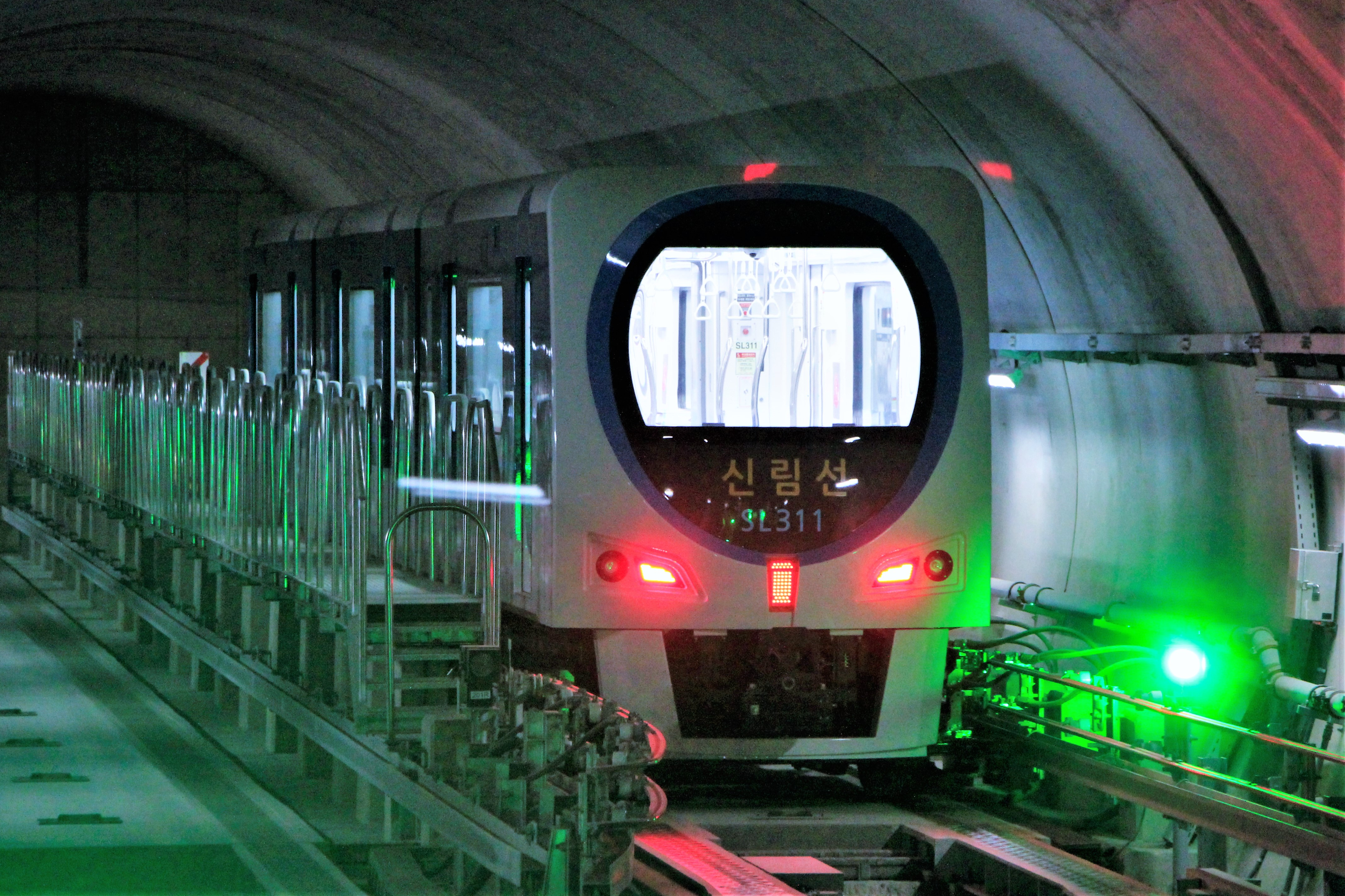
The Sillim Line is a rubber-tyred light metro which is part of the Seoul Metropolitan Subway

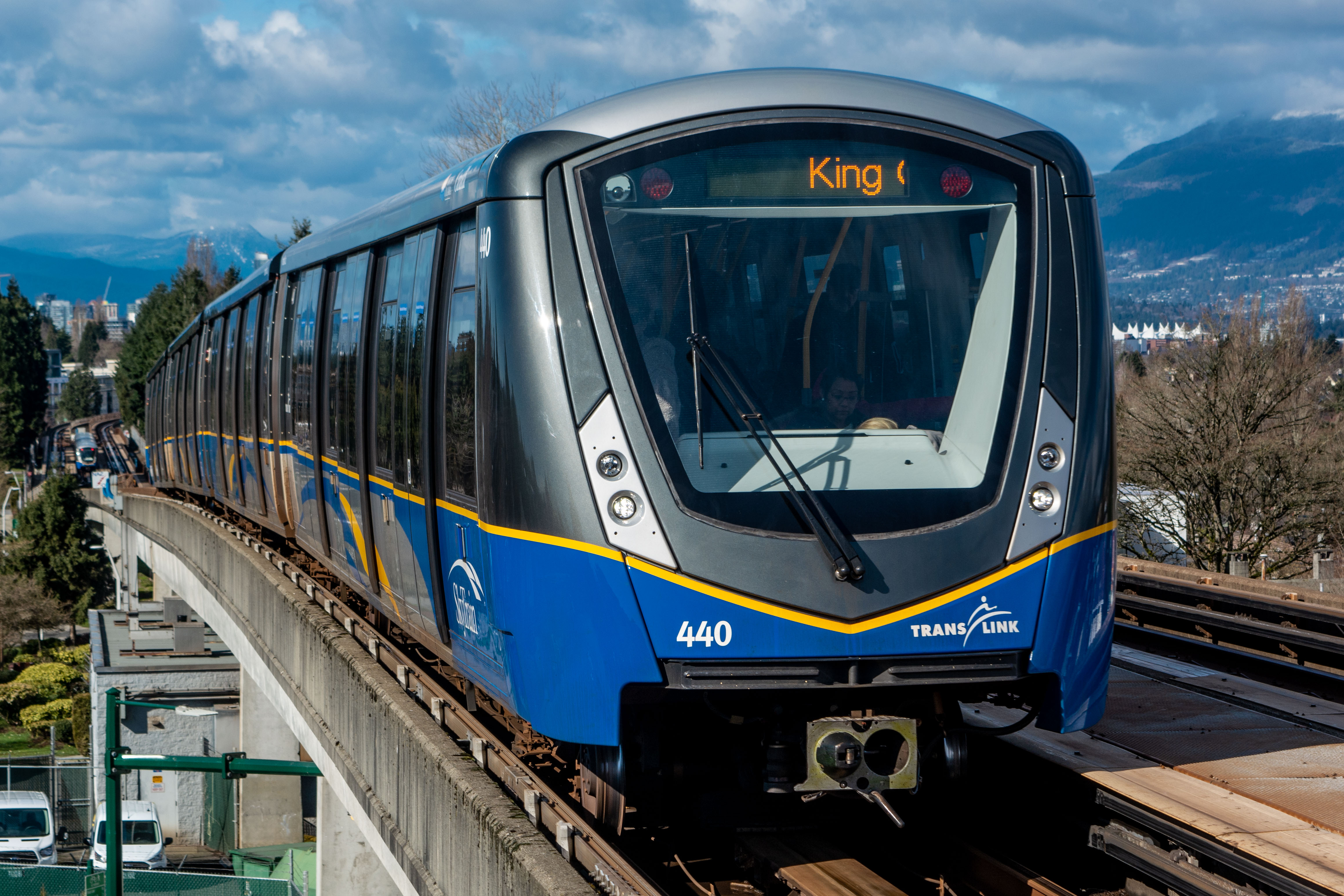
Vancouver SkyTrain – Expo Line

Light metro, light rapid transit (LRT) or a medium-capacity system (MCS), is a rail transport system with a capacity greater than light rail, but less than rapid transit. It typically resembles a rapid transit system in terms of infrastructure, but typically features smaller rolling stock and stations, and may have a differing network topology.

Since ridership determines the scale of a rapid transit system, statistical modeling allows planners to size the rail system for the needs of the area. When the predicted ridership falls between the service requirements of a light rail system and a rapid transit system, a light metro project is indicated. A light metro system may also result when a rapid transit system fails to achieve the requisite ridership due to network inadequacies (e.g. single-tracking) or changing demographics.

In contrast with light rail systems, a light metro system runs on an entirely grade separated exclusive right of way, and is therefore completely separated from other traffic. In some cases, the distance between stations is much longer than typically found on rapid transit systems. A light metro system may also be suitable for branch line connections to another mode of a heavy-capacity transport system, such as an airport or a main route of a metro network. However, despite their smaller trains, some light metro systems can rival rapid transit networks in terms of capacity thanks to automatic train operation allowing extremely high-frequency service.

== Definition ==
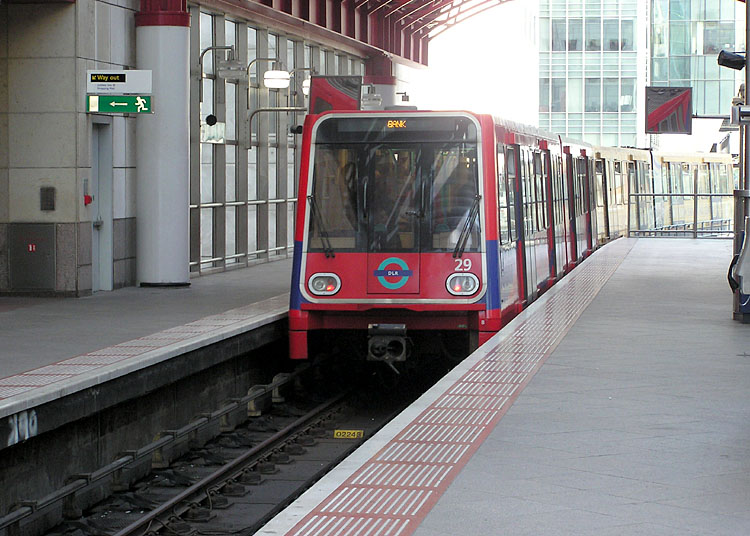
A Docklands Light Railway train leaving Canary Wharf DLR station

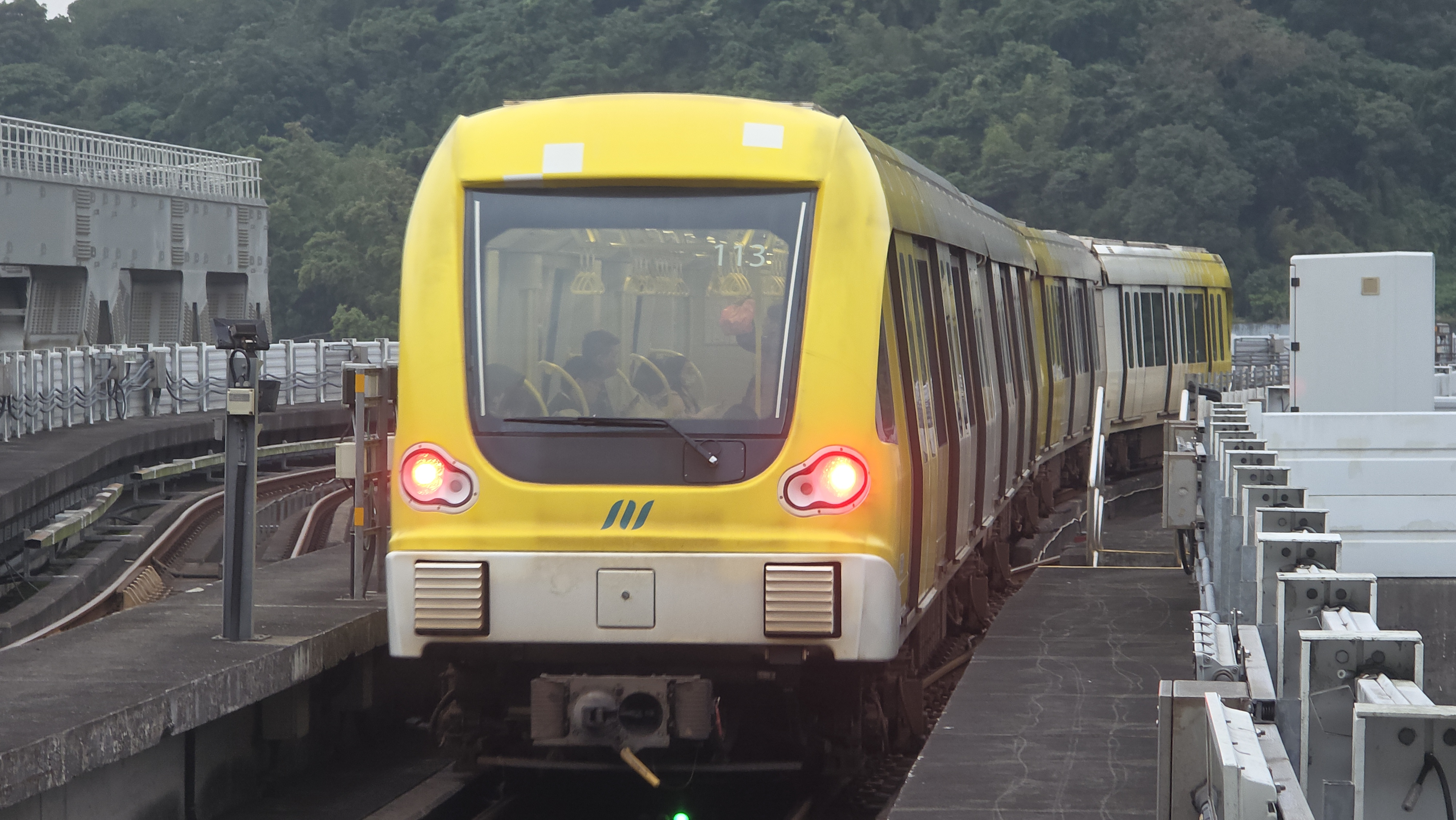
Taipei Metro – Circular Line

Light metro systems typically feature shorter trains and smaller stations than rapid transit and thus, lower capacity; this is typically their defining feature, especially compared to other rail transport in the same area. Automatic train operation is more common on light metro systems than rapid transit systems, which has allowed some systems to achieve extremely high frequency, with headways as close as 90 seconds during peak hours, making them competitive with traditional human-driven metro systems in terms of capacity.

Rubber-tyred metro technology, such as the VAL system used on the Taipei Metro, is sometimes used for light metro systems, due to its low running noise, as well as the ability to climb steeper grades and turn tighter curves, thus allowing more flexible alignments.

Rapid transit systems generally have train headways of 10 minutes or better during peak hours. Some systems that qualify as rapid transit in other technical respects (e.g. are fully grade separated), but which have network inadequacies (e.g. a section of single track rail) which cap headways, resulting in decreased capacity, and thus would be more accurately defined as light metro systems as a result.

=== Capacity ===
A report from the World Bank places the capacity of a light metro system at 15,000 to 30,000 p/h/d (passengers per hour per direction or PPHPD). For comparison, ridership capacity of more than 30,000 p/h/d has been quoted as the standard for rapid transit systems, while light rail systems have passenger capacity volumes of around 10,000 to 12,000 p/h/d or 12,000 to 18,000 p/h/d. VAL (Véhicule Automatique Léger) systems are categorised as light metro because their manufacturer defines their passenger capacities as being up to 30,000 p/h/d.

However, the capacity boundaries for a line to be categorised as a light metro system varies according to the standard used, sometimes even within a single country. For example, the Taiwan Ministry of Transportation and Communications states that each "medium-capacity system" can board around 6,000 to 20,000 p/h/d, while the Taiwan Department of Rapid Transit Systems defines a capacity of 20,000 to 30,000 p/h/d, which approaches many rapid transit systems, as "medium-capacity systems".

In Hong Kong, MTR's Ma On Shan line was locally classified as a "medium-capacity system" (as it used shorter 4-car SP1950 trains, compared to 7- to 12-car trains on other MTR lines) but can attain up to 32,000 p/h/d which is comparable to the passenger capacity of some rapid transit systems. However, it was built to the full rapid transit standard as it was designed to be extended. Full-length, 8-car trains were deployed on the line in advance of its extension into the Tuen Ma line in June 2021. Two other lines, the Disneyland Resort line shuttle service since 2005 and the South Island line since December 2016, are also classified as "medium-capacity systems" because of their shorter trains and smaller capacity, however they use the same technology as the other rapid transit lines.

== Terminology ==
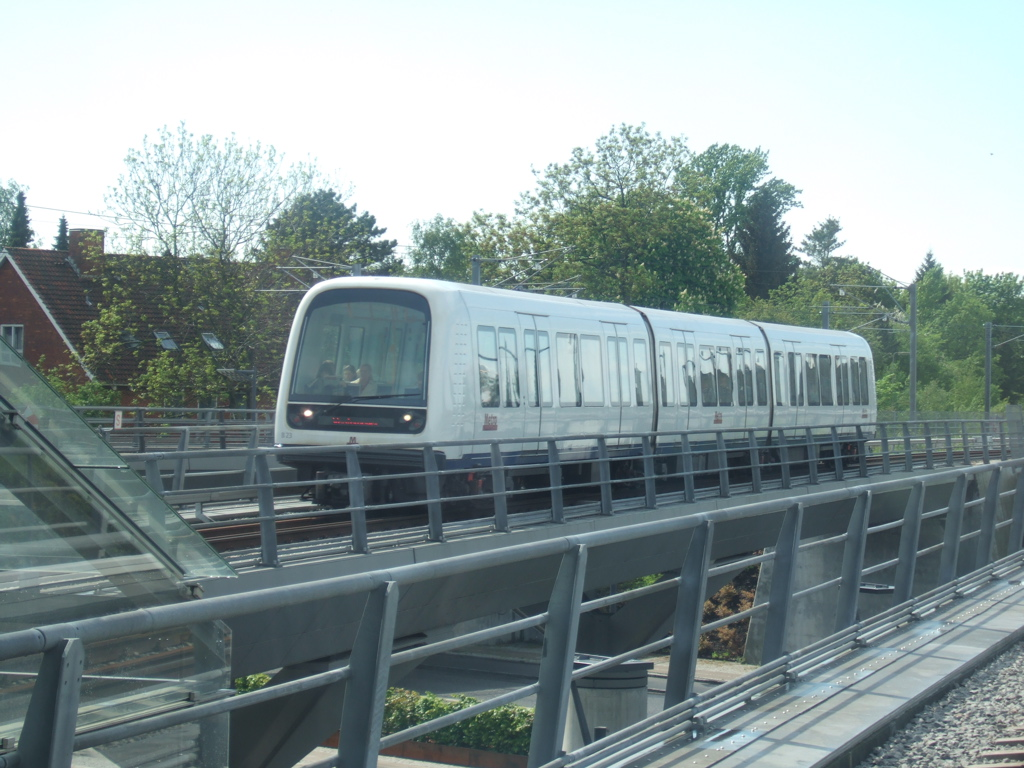
Train on the Copenhagen Metro

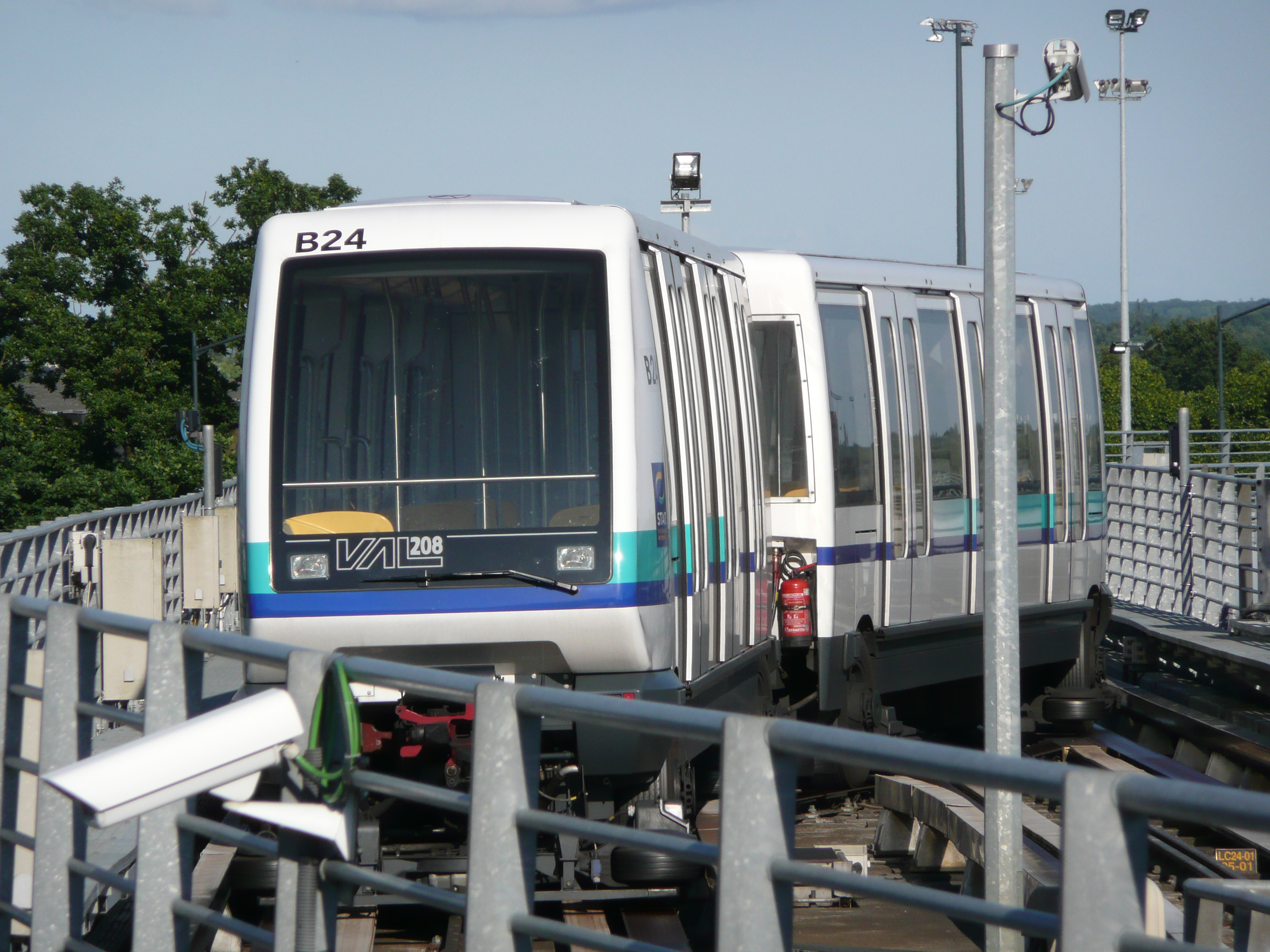
Rennes Metro VAL

"Light metro" is a common term in European countries, India, and South Korea.

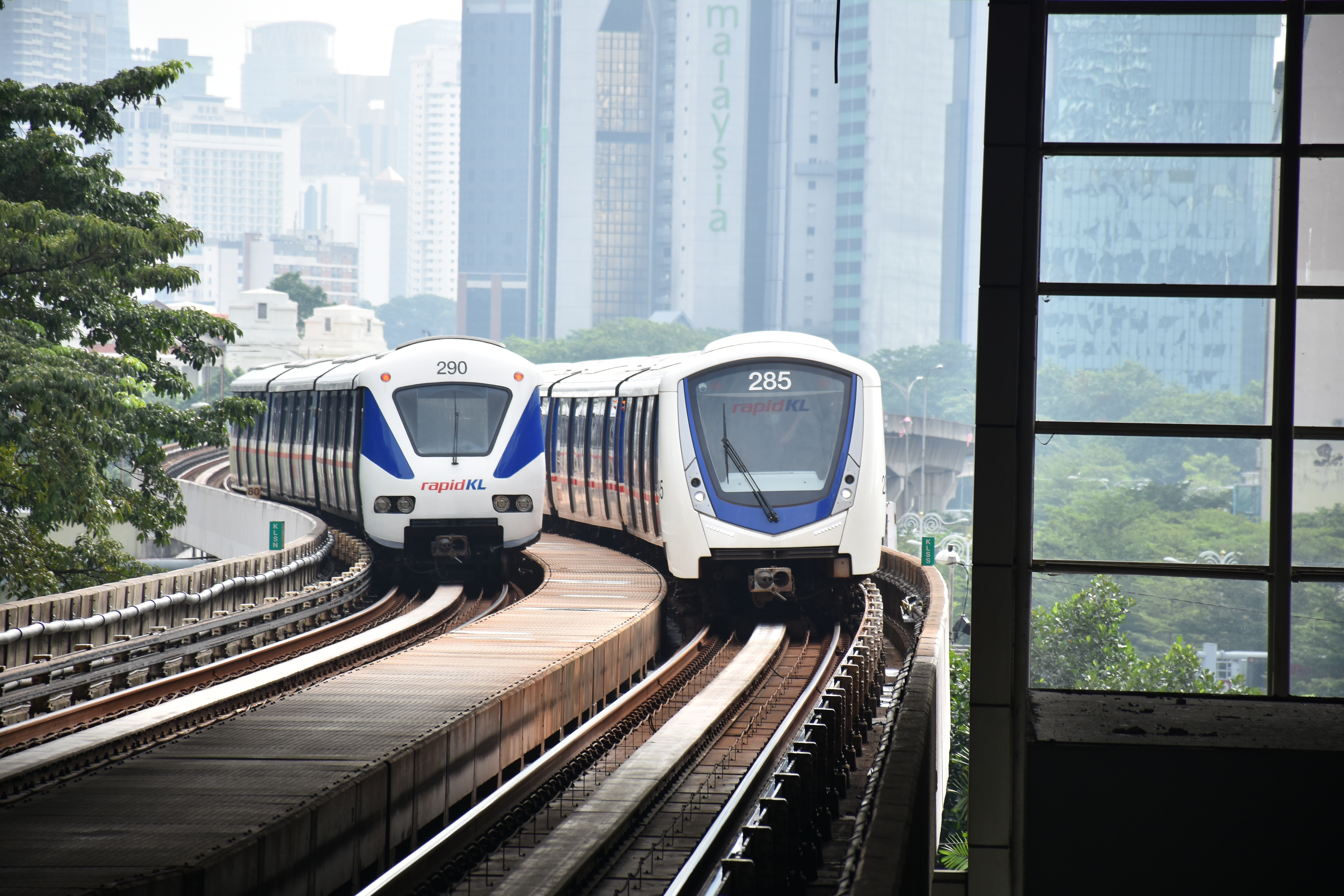
Rapid KL-Kelana Jaya Line in Kuala Lumpur, Malaysia

In some countries, however, light metro systems are conflated with light rail. In South Korea, "light rail" is used as the translation for the original Korean term, "경전철" – its literal translation is "light metro", but it actually means "Any railway transit other than heavy rail, which has capacity between heavy rail and bus transit". For example, the U Line in Uijeongbu utilises the VAL system, categorized as a variant of light metro by the LRTA and other organizations, though the operator itself and South Korean sources refer to the U Line as "light rail". Busan–Gimhae Light Rail Transit is also akin to a light metro system in its appearance and features, thought the operator refers it as a "light rail". Likewise, Malaysian officials and media commonly refer to the Kelana Jaya, Ampang and Sri Petaling lines as "light rail transit" systems; when originally opened, the original Malay abbreviations for the lines, PUTRA-LRT (Projek Usahasama Transit Ringan Automatik/Automatic Light Transit Joint Venture Project) and STAR-LRT (Sistem Transit Aliran Ringan/Light Flow Transit System) did not clearly distinguish between light rail and light rapid transit. Some articles in India also refer to some "light metro"-type systems as "light rail". The Light Rail Transit Association (LRTA), a nonprofit organisation, also categorises several public transport systems as "light metro". (Note: The French term Métro léger, a literal translation of "light metro", means light rail.)

== Advantages and disadvantages ==
The main reason to construct a light metro system instead of a rapid transit system is to reduce costs, mainly because this system employs shorter vehicles and shorter stations.

Light metro systems may operate faster than rapid transit systems due to shorter dwell times at stations, and the faster acceleration and braking of lighter trains. For example, express trains on the New York City Subway are about as fast as the Vancouver SkyTrain, but these express trains skip most stops on lines where they operate, while the shorter automated SkyTrains make all stops.

Light metro systems have restricted growth capacities as ridership increases. For example, it is difficult to extend station platforms once a system is in operation, especially for underground railway systems, since this work must be done without interfering with traffic. Some railway systems, like Hong Kong and Wuhan, may make advance provisions for longer platforms, for example, so that they will be able to handle more spacious trains when demand warrants them. The Taipei Metro, for example, constructed extra space for two extra cars in all its Wenhu Line stations. Alternatively, automatic train operation may be introduced, or at least provided for, allowing for very tight headways, increasing capacity through frequency rather than vehicle size.

== List of light metro systems ==
The following is the list of currently-operating light metro systems as categorized by the Light Rail Transit Association (LRTA) as of March 2018, unless otherwise indicated. The lists do not include monorails and urban maglev, despite most of them also being "medium-capacity" rail systems.

=== Currently operating light metro systems ===
Country	Location	System	Lines	Year opened	Notes
Armenia	Yerevan	Yerevan Metro	1	1981	Rolling stock uses 2 and 3-car trains
Austria	Vienna	Vienna U-Bahn – Line 6	1	1989	Low-floor trains T and T1 built by Bombardier, 27.3 metres (90 ft) and 26.8 metres (88 ft) long respectively, are operated in 4-car configuration only. The capacity is 776 passengers compared to 882 for the rapid transit lines U1-U4
Bulgaria	Sofia	Sofia Metro – Line 3	1	2020	Driverless vehicle system – 60-metre-long (200 ft) trains; Siemens chosen as technology supplier
Canada	Ottawa	O-Train	3 (+1 under construction)	2019	While using vehicles typically seen in light rail systems, the system has a higher capacity operating 2-car (100-metre long) Citadis Spirit trains. In addition, the system is fully grade-separated from road traffic.
Canada	Montreal	Réseau express métropolitain	1 (+1 branch under construction)	2023	Driverless vehicle system. Categorised by itself as a light metro. Trains are 38 metres long.
Canada	Vancouver	SkyTrain	3	1985	While using vehicles typically seen in light metro systems, the Expo line approaches the capacity of a rapid transit system since it operates with longer 4, 5 and 6-car Bombardier trains. As of October 2026 the Millennium line uses 2 car Innovia metro trains. However, the Canada Line operates with 2-car Rotem trains.
China	Beijing	Beijing Subway – Capital Airport Express, Yanfang line	2	2008	Capital Airport Express uses 4-car L-type trains, 60 metres (200 ft) long. Yanfang line uses 4-car B-type trains, 76 metres (249 ft) long. Trains from both lines are driverless.
China	Changchun	Changchun Rail Transit – Line 3, Line 4, Line 8	3	2002	All three lines use light rail vehicles, with line 3 also having level crossings.
China	Dalian	Dalian Metro – Line 3, Line 12, Line 13	3	2002	Uses 4-car B-type trains, with some trains on line 3 having 2 cars.
China	Foshan	Foshan Metro – Line 1 (Nanhai Tram)	1	2021	The line (also called Nanhai New Transit) uses light rail vehicles, 35 metres (115 ft) long.
China	Guangzhou	Guangzhou Metro – Line 4, Line 6, Guangfo line, and Zhujiang New Town People Mover	4	2005	Lines 4 and 6 use 4-car L-type trains, 67m long. Guangfo line uses 4-car B-type trains, 76 metres (249 ft) long. Zhujiang New Town People Mover uses 14 Bombardier's APM 100 cars built in Pittsburgh, Pennsylvania.
China	Nanjing	Nanjing Metro – Line S6, Line S7, Line S8, Line S9	4	2014	Lines S6, S7, and S8 use 4-car B-type trains, 76 metres (249 ft) long, while line S9 uses 3-car B-type trains, 57 m long.
China	Shanghai	Shanghai Metro – Line 5 (branch), Line 6, and Pujiang Line	3	2003	Line 5 branch and line 6 use 4-car, 76 metres (249 ft) long, C-type trains. Pujiang line uses 11 Bombardier Transportation's APM 300 cars.
China	Tianjin	Tianjin Metro – Line 9	1	2004	Line 9 uses 4-car B-type trains, 76 metres (249 ft) long.
China	Wuhan	Wuhan Metro – Line 1	1	2004	Line 1 uses 4-car B-type trains, 76 metres (249 ft) long.
China	Hong Kong	Disneyland Resort Line (Penny's Bay Rail Link)	1	2005	Trains: 4 compartments without drivers. Some of the M-Train cars used in the Disneyland Resort line were originally ordered from 1994–1998 as subtype H-Stock train (Phase 3 EMU, A/C 270–291, B/C 486–496). Units A/C274 A/C281 A/C284 A/C289 A/C291 and B/C490 are now used on the Disneyland Resort line.
China	Hong Kong	South Island line	1	2016	Trains: 3-car S-Trains. Categorised as a "medium-capacity system".
China	Macau	Macau Light Rapid Transit	1	2019	Uses Mitsubishi Heavy Industries Crystal Mover APM vehicles with rubber tyres running on concrete tracks. Mitsubishi supplied 55 two-car trains that are fully automated (driverless) and utilise a rubber-tyred APM system. They have a capacity of up to 476 passengers.
Denmark	Copenhagen	Copenhagen Metro	4	2002	Driverless vehicle system. Trains: 3-car configuration, 39 metres (128 ft) length.
France	Lille	Lille Metro	2	1983	VAL people mover system. Trains: 2-car configuration, 26 metres (85 ft) in length, with a passenger capacity of 208–240 per train (depending on VAL 206 or VAL 208 train). UrbanRail.net describes it as a "new generation of metro systems".
France	Lyon	Lyon Metro	4	1978	Trains: Driverless, 2 or 3-car configuration, 36 metres (118 ft) to 54 metres (177 ft) long. Can carry 252 to 325 people in a train.
France	Marseille	Marseille Metro	2	1977	Trains: 4-car configuration, 65 metres (213 ft) long.
France	Paris	Orlyval	1	1991	VAL people mover system, using VAL 206 vehicles.
France	Rennes	Rennes Metro	2	2002	VAL people mover system – while trains have 80 second headways, they can only carry 158 people per train. Described as a "mini-metro line".
France	Toulouse	Toulouse Metro	2	1993	Although a VAL system, LRTA defines the system as "Metro". On the other hand, UrbanRail.net describes it as a "light metro VAL system".
Hungary	Budapest	Budapest Metro Line 1	1	1896	Trains: The line uses 3-car, 30 metres (98 ft) long trains that can hold up to 190 people.
India	Gurgaon	Rapid Metro Gurgaon	1	2013	Driverless vehicle system. The line is designed to carry up to 30,000 passengers per hour. Several articles define the system as "light metro".
Indonesia	Jakarta	Jakarta LRT	1	2019	Jakarta LRT is the first line in Jakarta to use a third rail system. It uses standard gauge (1435 mm). One trainset can carry 270-278 passengers
Indonesia	Jakarta	Jabodebek LRT	2	2023	The elevated standard-gauge line is electrified at 750V dc third rail. It has moving block signalling designed for headways of 2–3 minutes.
Indonesia	Palembang	Palembang LRT	1	2018	Trains uses 3-car configuration
Italy	Brescia	Brescia Metro	1	2013	Trains: 3-car configuration, 39 metres (128 ft) length.
Italy	Catania	Catania Metro	1	1999	Single-tracked at-grade section limits headways to 15 minutes. Currently 4.6 kilometres (2.9 mi) of double track extension are under construction.
Italy	Genoa	Genoa Metro	1	1990	Generally considered to be a "light metro" considering its low frequency, limited hours of operation and reduced transport capacity. It is actually categorised as "light rail" by LRTA.
Italy	Milan	Milan Metro: Line 4 and Line 5	2	2013, 2022	Driverless vehicle system. Trains: 4-car configuration, 50.5 metres (166 ft) length, capacity for 536 passengers.
Italy	Naples	Naples Metro	1	1993	Line 6 is categorised as "light metro" system, with only 16 minute headways.
Italy	Perugia	MiniMetro	1	2008	LRTA defines the system as a "light metro" system, while they regarded the same system in Laon, which ceased in 2016, as a "cable monorail".
Italy	Turin	Turin Metro	1	2006	VAL people mover system.
Japan	Hiroshima	Astram Line	1	1994	6-car trains, manually operated
Japan	Kobe	Kobe New Transit – Port Island and Rokkō Island lines	2	1981, 1990	4-car trains, driverless
Japan	Osaka	Nankō Port Town Line	1	1981	4-car trains, driverless
Japan	Saitama	New Shuttle	1	1983	6-car trains, manually operated
Japan	Tokyo	Nippori-Toneri Liner	1	2008	5-car trains, driverless
Japan	Tokyo	Yurikamome	1	1995	6-car trains, driverless
Japan	Yokohama	Kanazawa Seaside Line	1	1989	5-car trains, driverless
Kazakhstan	Astana	Astana Light Metro	1	2026	4-car trains, driverless
Malaysia	Kuala Lumpur	Rapid KL – Kelana Jaya Line, Ampang Line, Sri Petaling Line, Shah Alam Line	4	1998, 1996, 2026	Kelana Jaya Line: Bombardier Innovia ART 200 Trains with mixed 2-car and 4-car configuration fleet. Bombardier Innovia Metro 300 Trains with 4-car configuration. Ampang and Sri Petaling Lines: CRRC Zhuzhou LRV Trains, 6-car configuration. Shah Alam Line: CRRC Zhuzhou Trains, 3-car configuration with capacity of 674 passengers.
Philippines	Manila	LRT Line 1	1	1984	Trains: Line began with 2-car configuration, reconfigured to 3-car in 1999, and procured new 4-car trains in 1999, 2006, and 2022. Line was originally designed for 18,000 p/h/d capacity, increased to 40,000 p/h/d in 2006. Categorised as "light rail" by LRTA.
Philippines	Manila	MRT Line 3	1	1999	Trains: 3-car configuration, with a max. capacity of 1,182 passengers, and running with 3.5–4 minute headways. 4-car trains with a max. capacity of 1,576 passengers were introduced in 2022. However, line is designed for 23,000 p/h/d capacity, expandable to 48,000 p/h/d.
Russia	Moscow	Moscow Metro: Line 12 – Butovskaya Line	1	2003	Can carry 6,700 p/h/d. Trains: 3-car configuration, ~85 metres (279 ft) length
Singapore	Singapore	Singapore MRT: Circle line, Downtown line	3	2009, 2013	The Circle line rolling stock consists of Alstom C830, C830C and C851E trains in 3-car formations with a capacity of 931 passengers. The Downtown line rolling stock consists of Bombardier C951 & C951A trains also in 3-car formations with a capacity of 931 passengers.
South Korea	Busan	Busan–Gimhae Light Rail Transit	1	2011	Driverless vehicle system. Trains: 2-car configuration. Unmentioned by LRTA, but the operator calls the system "light rail".
South Korea	Gimpo	Gimpo Goldline	1	2019	Each train consists of 2-car trains and runs unmanned.
South Korea	Incheon	Incheon Subway Line 2	1	2016	Each train consists of 2-car trains and runs unmanned.
South Korea	Seoul	Ui LRT	1	2017	Each train consists of 2-car trains and runs unmanned.
South Korea	Seoul	Sillim Line	1	2022	Each train consists of 2-car trains and runs unmanned.
South Korea	Uijeongbu	U Line	1	2012	VAL driverless system. Trains: 2-car configuration.; Categorised as a "light metro" system by LRTA and elsewhere, though there are also articles categorizing it as "Light Rail".
South Korea	Yongin	Yongin Everline	1	2013	Driverless vehicle system applied.
Spain	Barcelona	Barcelona Metro: Line 8 and Line 11	2	2003	Driverless vehicle system. Trains: 2-car configuration. LRTA also categorises Line 8 as a "light metro" system.
Spain	Málaga	Málaga Metro	1	2014	System contains at-grade intersections on surface section of Line 1. Described as a "light metro" system by at least one rail publication.
Spain	Palma, Majorca	Palma Metro: Line M1	1	2007	Mostly underground line operates with just 15-minute headways and 2-car trains (306 passengers max.); one reference even categorises line as "light rail".
Spain	Seville	Seville Metro	1	2000	Trains: 31.3 metres (103 ft) length with a max. capacity of 280 passengers. Described as a "light metro" by rolling stock manufacturer, CAF.
Switzerland	Lausanne	Lausanne Metro	2	1991	Line M1 uses light rail vehicles, 30 metres (98 ft) long. Line M2 has driverless, rubber-tyred trains; 30 metres (98 ft) long.
Taiwan	Taipei	Taipei Metro: Wenhu/Brown Line and Circular/Yellow Line	2	1996, 2020	Brown Line (Line 1) – Trains: Rubber-tire system; 4-car configuration; categorised as a part of the "metro" by LRTA.; Yellow Line – 4-car AnsaldoBreda Driverless Metro vehicles, categorised as a "light metro" system by LRTA.
Taiwan	Taichung	Taichung MRT: Green line	1	2021	2-car EMU.
Thailand	Bangkok	Bangkok MRT: Blue Line and Purple Line	2	2004, 2016	3-car configuration
Turkey	Ankara	Ankaray Light Metro (A1 Line)	1	1996	Trains: 3-car configuration, approx. 90 metres (300 ft) length. Categorised as a "light rail" by LRTA, though Current capacity: 27,000 p/h/d.
Turkey	Bursa	Bursaray	2	2002	Uses light rail cars, similar to Frankfurt U-Bahn
Turkey	Istanbul	Istanbul Metro: M1 Line (Istanbul Hafif Metro)	1	1989	Trains: 4-car configuration. "Hafif Metro" literally translates as "Light Metro". Categorised as a "light rail" system by the LRTA.
Turkey	İzmir	İzmir Metro: M1 Line (İzmir Hafif Rayli Metro Sistemi)	1	2000	Trains: 5-car configuration, upgraded from former 3- and 4-car configurations
Turkey	Adana	Adana Metro: M1 Line	1	2010	Trains: 4-car configuration.It's poorly designed, and it doesn't reach its expected ridership amount.
United Kingdom	Glasgow	Glasgow Subway	1	1896	Gauge: 4 ft (1,219 mm). Trains: 3-car configuration.
United Kingdom	London	Docklands Light Railway	3	1987	Driverless vehicle system. Trains: generally 2- to 3-car configuration. Categorised as a "light rail" by LRTA.
United Kingdom	Tyne and Wear	Tyne and Wear Metro	2	1980	Trains: 2 MU configuration with 7 level crossings.
United States	Detroit	Detroit People Mover	1	1987	2-car trains, driverless
United States	Honolulu	Skyline	1	2023	4-car trains, driverless
United States	Miami	Metromover	3	1986	2-car trains, driverless
United States	Philadelphia	M (part of the SEPTA Metro)	1	1907	Primarily on a surface-level "right-of-way" with partial triple-tracking, allowing for express services. Has been categorised by APTA as "light rapid rail transit". (Note: While it has high platforms and third rail power, all intermediate stops are flag stops and fares must be paid to the operator upon boarding except at the termini. This makes it difficult to categorise, as it has the infrastructure of a light metro but is operated in many ways like a trolley service.)
Venezuela	Maracaibo	Maracaibo Metro	1	2006	Trains: 3-car trainset configuration, ~58 metres (190 ft) length (originally designed for Prague Metro). Categorised as a "light rail" by LRTA.
Venezuela	Valencia	Valencia Metro	1	2007	Trains: 2-car Siemens SD-460 configuration, ~55 metres (180 ft) length. Categorised as a "light rail" by LRTA.
Vietnam	Hanoi	Hanoi Metro	2	2021	Trains: 4-car configuration
Vietnam	Ho Chi Minh City	Ho Chi Minh City Metro	1	2024	Trains: 3-car configuration, 61.3 m long, (201 ft)

=== Under construction light metro systems ===
Country	Location	System	Planned opening	Notes
Singapore	Singapore	Jurong Region Line	2028	Hyundai Rotem J151 trains will operate in a 3 car configuration that can carry 600 passengers
Malaysia	Penang	Mutiara Line	2031	First comprehensive light metro network outside of Klang Valley. The line will connect the island and mainland by rail.
Romania	Cluj-Napoca	Cluj-Napoca Metro	2031	Romania's second mass transit network. Operated as three-car driverless trains.
United States	New York City	Interborough Express	Early 2030s	Line will be used to connect Brooklyn and Queens.

=== Former light metro systems ===
The following is the list of former light metro systems that either developed into a rapid transit system, or which are no longer in operation:

- Guangzhou, China
  - Line 3 – began with 3-car configuration, changed to 6-car in 2010.
- Komaki, Japan
  - Peachliner – abandoned on 30 September 2006.
- Seoul, South Korea
  - Line 9 – trains lengthened from 4 cars to 6 cars in 2019.
- Sha Tin and Ma On Shan, Hong Kong
  - Ma On Shan Rail – converted from 4- to 8-car configuration and became part of Tuen Ma line.
- Toronto, Ontario
  - Line 3 Scarborough – Categorised by APTA as being "intermediate rail" (i.e. between "heavy rail" and "light rail"), and categorised as a "light metro" system by LRTA. Scheduled to cease operations in November 2023, service was suspended following a derailment in July 2023 and was not resumed, instead being replaced by an express bus service.

== See also ==
- Automated guideway transit
- Maglev
- Metro
- Passenger rail terminology
- People mover
- Rail transport
- Rubber-tyred metro
- Urban rail
- VAL

== Bibliography ==
- Taplin, Michael. "A world of trams and urban transit". lrta.org. Light Rail Transit Association. Archived from the original on 2019-04-06.
- "Metros: Keeping pace with 21st century cities". uitp.org. International Association of Public Transport (French: L'Union internationale des transports publics (UITP)).
- Schwandl, Robert. "UrbanRail.Net". UrbanRail.Net.
