= Maracaibo Metro =

Light rail system in Maracaibo, Venezuela

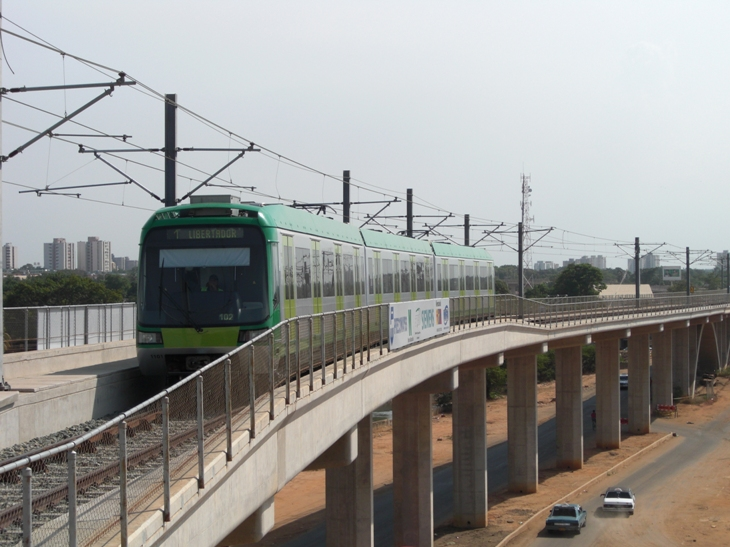

Overview
- Locale: Maracaibo, Zulia, Venezuela
- Transit type: Light rail/rapid transit
- Number of lines: 1
- Number of stations: 6
- Daily ridership: 42,000

Operation
- Began operation: 2006

Technical
- System length: 6.5 km (4.0 mi)

The Maracaibo Metro, also known as Metro del Sol Amado or MetroMara, is a light rail system in Maracaibo, Venezuela.

The line encompasses the suburbs of Maracaibo and Maracaibo itself as drop-off point. Also one station is a transfer point between rail services provided by IAFE. There are a total of nine stations along the line – two elevated stations (Urdaneta and Libertador), and four at-grade stations.

The line was built by the city government of Maracaibo and the Venezuelan national government. In March 2009 it was reported that corruption allegations regarding the 1998 signing of the construction contract with Siemens were being investigated.

== Lines ==
Map of the Maracaibo Metro lines.

=== Line 1 ===
The first stage of line 1 is 6.9 km (4.3 mi) long. The planned system of four lines will be 60 km (37 mi) long in the future.

The German company Siemens is supplying signalling, telecommunication and electrification systems as well as the first 7 metro trains, based on the vehicles running on the Prague Metro line C.

The first of 4 proposed lines, Line 1, has opened some stations while others are still under construction or in the planning/design stages. A feeder 1.1 km (0.68 mi) support line connects the maintenance and train yard areas to the terminal station Altos de La Vanega.

Line	Terminals	Service	Length	Stations	Notes
1	Altos de la Vanega ↔ El Varillal	November 25, 2006	1.2 km	2	Free service with 600 passenger capacity
1	Altos de la Vanega ↔ El Guayabal	August 27, 2007	2.5 km	3	First fare collection BsF 0,5 (23US cents) was introduced January 21, 2008. Service hours: Monday to Friday 6:00 a.m to 8:00 p.m. and Saturday, Sundays and holidays 2:00 p.m. to 8:00 p.m.
1	Altos de la Vanega ↔ Sabaneta	May 11, 2008	3.4 km	4	
1	Altos de la Vanega ↔ Libertador	June 8, 2009	6.5 km	6	

=== Stations ===
Line 1: First Stage

- Altos de La Vanega
- El Varillal
- El Guayabal
- Sabaneta
- Urdaneta
- Libertador

Line 1: Second Stage

Additional stations are:

- Padilla
- Falcón
- 5 de Julio

Line 2 (Under study)

Probable stations are:

- 5 de Julio
- Paraíso
- Indio Mara
- Universidad
- Polideportivo
- Galerías
- Panamericano
- Mercado Periférico
- La Curva de Molina

== Rolling stock ==
The Maracaibo Metro is served by 7 sets of 3-car Siemens Mobility trains, a modification of the M1 type rolling stock used on the Prague Metro.

== See also ==
- Trolmérida
- IAFE
- Caracas Metro
- Los Teques Metro
- Valencia Metro
- List of Latin American rail transit systems by ridership
- Light metro
- List of rapid transit systems
