= ARV Aragua =

Nueva Esparta-class destroyer of the Venezuelan Navy

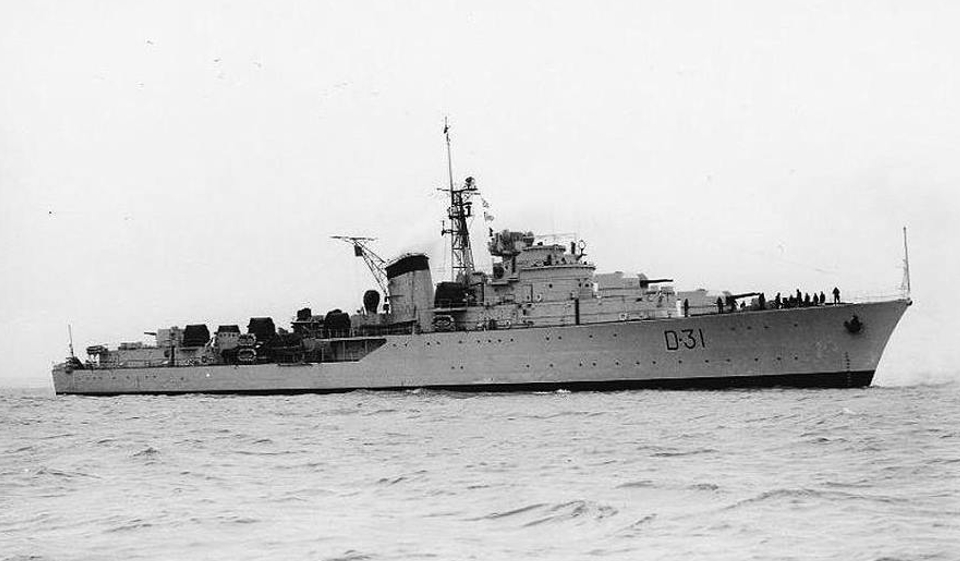
- The destroyer Aragua

History

Venezuela
- Name: ARV Aragua
- Namesake: Aragua
- Ordered: 1950
- Builder: Vickers-Armstrongs Shipyards Barrow in Furness
- Identification: D-31

General characteristics
- Class & type: Nueva Esparta-class destroyer
- Displacement: Standard: 2,600 tons; Full load: 3,670 tons
- Length: 402 ft (122,5 m)
- Beam: 43 ft (13 m)
- Draught: 19 ft (5.8 m)
- Propulsion: 2 Foster Wheeler boilers (650 psi, 850 °F), Parsons steam turbines, 50,000 shp
- Speed: 34 kn ( km/h)
- Range: 10,000 nmi at 10 kn, 1 month
- Complement: 18 officers and 236 crew members
- Sensors & processing systems: Radar Type 293Q target indication; Radar Type 291 air warning; Radar Type 274 navigation; Radar Type 275 fire control on director Mk.VI; Radar Type 262 fire control on director CRBF and STAAG Mk.II
- Armament: 6 × QF 4.5 in /45 (114 mm) Mark V in 3 twin mountings UD Mark VI; 4 × 40 mm /60 Bofors A/A in 2 twin mounts STAAG Mk.II; 2 × 40 mm /60 Bofors A/A in 1 twin mount Mk.V; 2 × Torpedo tubes for 21 in (533 mm) torpedoes Mk.IX; 1 × 'Squid A/S mortar

ARV Aragua was a Nueva Esparta-class destroyer for the Venezuelan Navy. Named for the Venezuelan state of Aragua, it was the leader of the 3rd Destroyer Division and the first one of her own sub-class, among ships built in the United Kingdom for Venezuela naval forces in the 1950s. Built by Vickers-Armstrong at Barrow, Aragua was laid down on 29 June 1953, launched on 27 January 1955, and completed on 14 February 1956. The ship continued in naval service until 1975.
