= Maracaibo Province (Venezuela) =

- Coordinates: 10°38′N 71°38′W

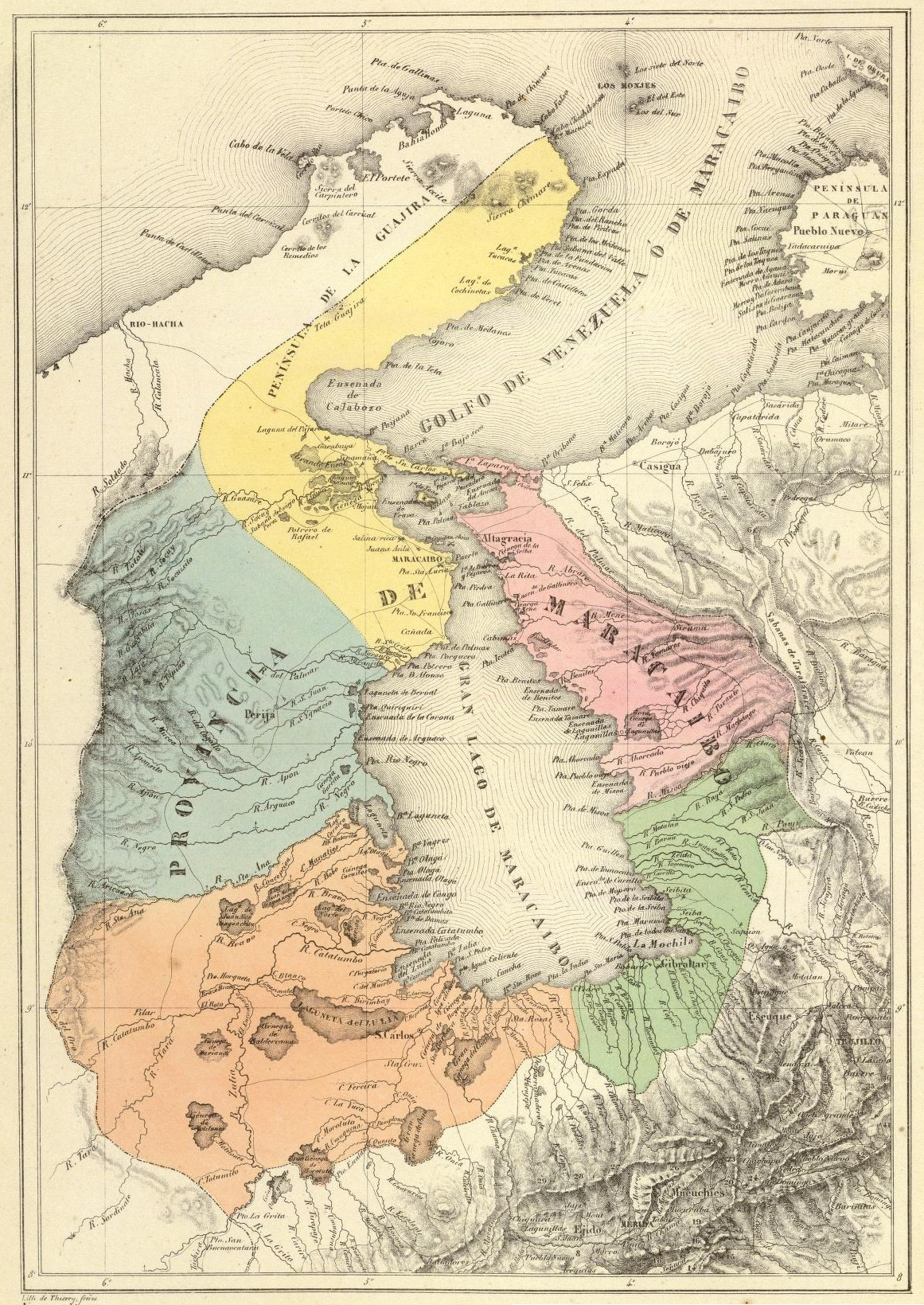
Province of Maracaibo, 1840

Maracaibo Province was a historical region of Venezuela that corresponds roughtly to the actual Zulia State.

The eighteenth century geographer Antonio de Alcedo mentions Maracaibo as one of the cities of the Venezuela Province, a jurisdiction of the vice-royalty of New Grenade.

In 1777, the Crown of Castile reforms its American territories among which that of the contemporary Venezuela. The creation of the Capitania General of Venezuela englobes Cumana, Maracaibo, Guayana, Trinidad and Margarita that is an important portion of the Caribbean region of the vice-royalty of New Grenade.

In 1812, in the Cortes de Cadiz, the province of Maracaibo is represented by José Domingo de las Nieves Rus y Ortega de Azarraullía. Later on, the jurisdiction will be renamed Zulia Department until 1830 when it integrates de bolivarian Gran Colombia.

In 1864 the area was named Maracaibo State, which shortly after was renamed to Sovereign State of Zulia and in 1874 Zulia State.
