= List of ships of the Royal Yugoslav Navy =

The naval ensign of the Kingdom of Yugoslavia

The Navy of the Kingdom of Serbs, Croats and Slovenes – from 1929, the Royal Yugoslav Navy (Serbo-Croatian Latin: Kraljevska mornarica; Serbo-Croatian Cyrillic: Краљевска морнарица; КМ) – included a wide range of vessels during its existence from 1920 to 1945. This list includes all sea-going warships ranging from a light cruiser down to motor torpedo boats (MTBs), and also includes river monitors that operated on the Danube and other rivers. Large auxiliary vessels such as submarine tenders and tankers are included, but hulks, tugs and smaller auxiliary craft are not.

The KM was formed in 1920, but it was not until March 1921 that a number of former Austro-Hungarian vessels were transferred, some of which were already obsolete. The only modern seagoing warships transferred were twelve torpedo boats. Little was done to improve the fleet during the 1920s, but fleet modernisation was underway from the early 1930s, with a British-made flotilla leader followed by a class of modern French-designed destroyers and German-built MTBs. Almost all of the fleet was captured by the Axis powers during the April 1941 invasion of Yugoslavia, but a few vessels escaped to form the KM-in-exile, which operated under British supervision. Later in the war, several vessels that had been in Italian service were returned to the KM-in-exile, and these were joined by a British corvette. At the end of the war, these vessels were transferred to the fledgling Yugoslav Navy. (Note: In each section of this list, the citations within the text also relate to the table.)

== Coastal defence ship ==
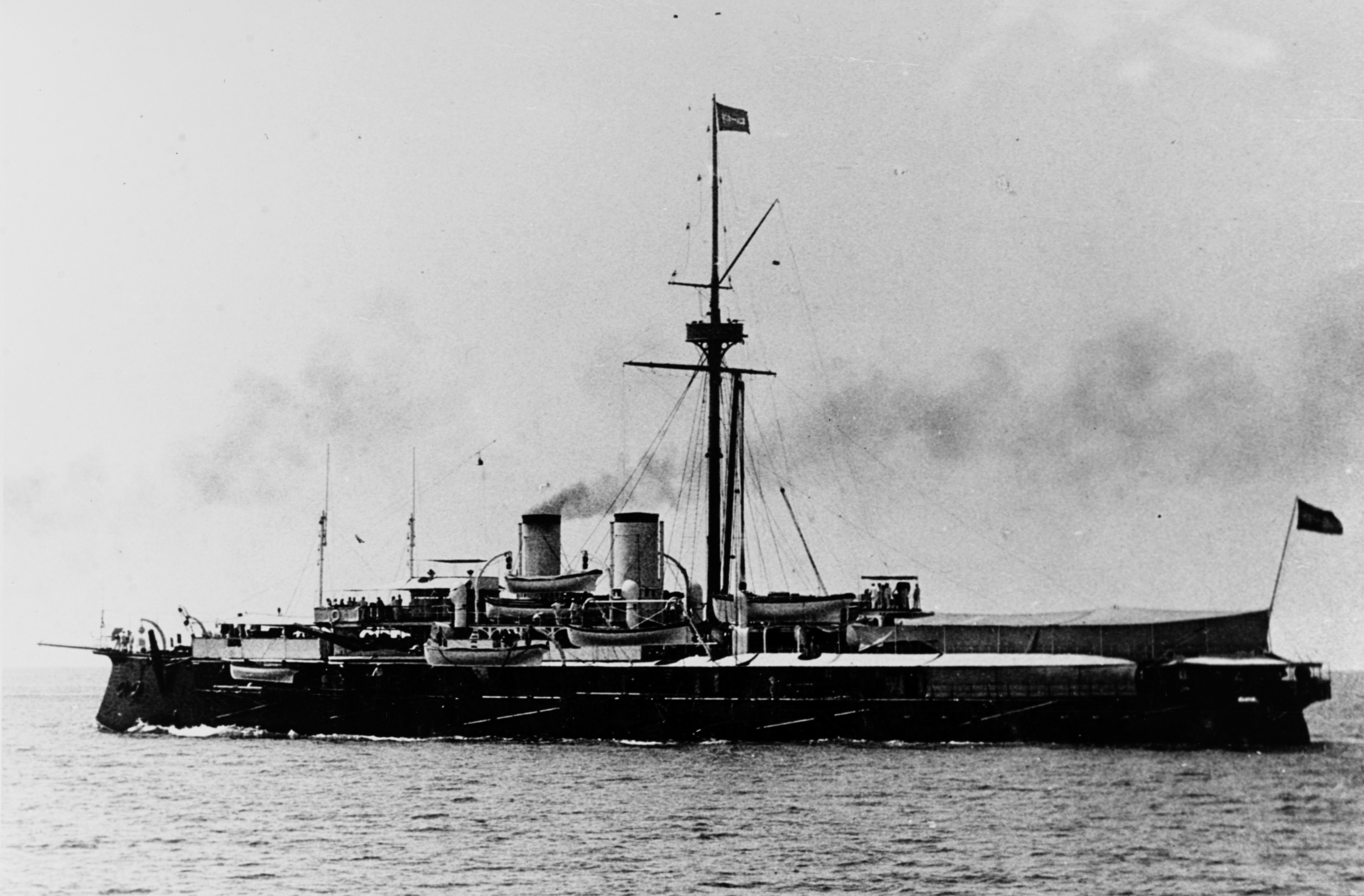
Kumbor as the Austro-Hungarian SMS Kronprinz Erzherzog Rudolf

The former SMS Kronprinz Erzherzog Rudolf had been completed as an ironclad warship in 1889. She was an obsolete coastal defence ship when acquired by the Navy of the Serbs, Croats and Slovenes in 1921, and was scrapped the following year.

Ship/vessel	Origin	Primary armament	Displacement in long tons	Maximum speed in knots	In service	Fate
Kumbor	Austria-Hungary	3 × 30.5 cm (12 in) guns	6,721	15.5	March 1921	Kumbor was scrapped in 1922.

== Light cruiser ==
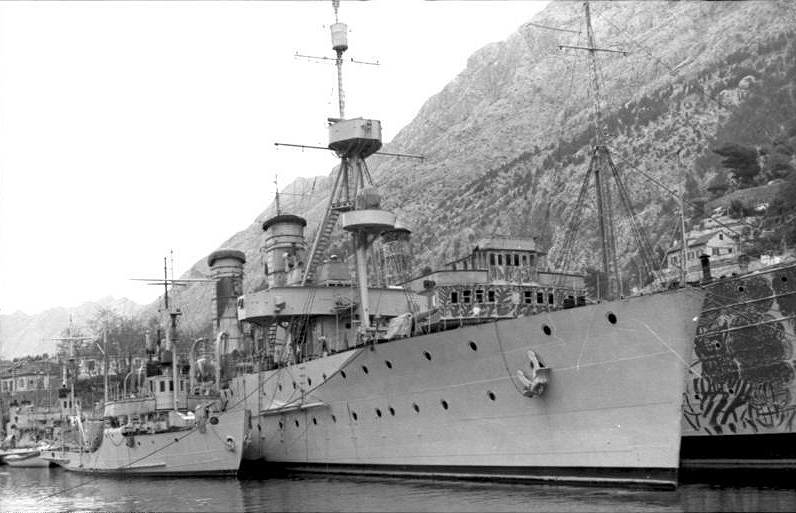
Dalmacija in the Bay of Kotor after her capture by the Italians

The former Gazelle-class light cruiser SMS Niobe had been commissioned into the Imperial German Navy in 1900, so by 1941, Dalmacija was obsolete and was being used as a gunnery training ship. Captured by the Italians during the April 1941 invasion of Yugoslavia, she was put into service in the Royal Italian Navy as Cattaro. She was captured from the Italians by the Germans after the Italian armistice with the Allies in September 1943, and served in the German Navy as Niobe. She also served in the Navy of the Independent State of Croatia as Zniam before being lost in December 1943.

Ship/vessel	Origin	Primary armament	Displacement in long tons	Maximum speed in knots	In service	Fate
Dalmacija	German Empire	10 × 10.5 cm (4.1 in) L/40 guns	2,916	21.5	26 June 1925	Zniam was run aground then destroyed by Royal Navy motor torpedo boats in December 1943.

== Destroyers ==
=== Dubrovnik ===
Dubrovnik was a flotilla leader built by a British shipyard in 1930–1931. Captured by the Italians in April 1941 she was put into service as Premuda, and was the most important and effective Italian war prize ship of World War II. She was captured by the Germans after the Italian armistice and served as TA32 until she was scuttled near the end of the war.

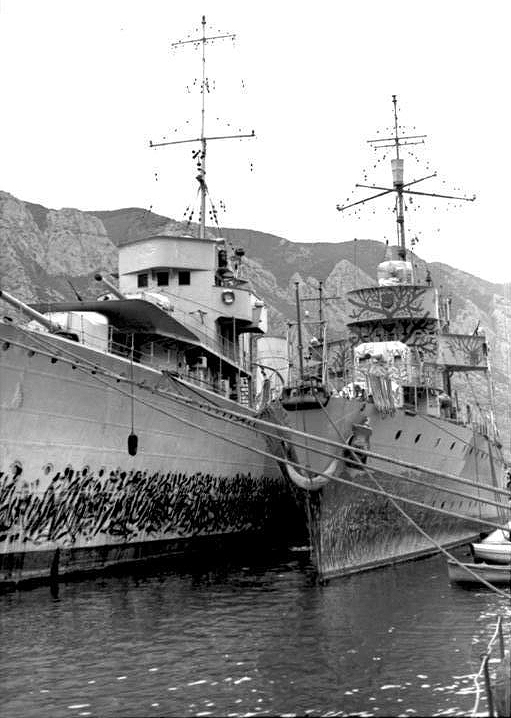
Dubrovnik (left) and Beograd (right) at the Bay of Kotor after capture by the Italians

Ship/vessel	Origin	Primary armament	Displacement in long tons	Maximum speed in knots	In service	Fate
Dubrovnik	United Kingdom	4 × Škoda 14 cm (5.5 in) guns	1,880	37	11 October 1931	TA32 was scuttled at Genoa on 24 April 1945.

=== Beograd class ===
The Beograd class were French-designed destroyers completed in 1937–1938. Zagreb was scuttled during the Axis invasion of Yugoslavia, but Beograd and Ljubljana fell into Italian hands. They served with the Italians as Sebenico and Lubiana respectively. Lubiana was lost in April 1943, but Sebenico was captured by the Germans after the Italian capitulation, and saw service as TA43 until she was scuttled at the end of the war.

Ship/vessel	Origin	Primary armament	Displacement in long tons	Maximum speed in knots	In service	Fate
Beograd	France	4 × Škoda 12 cm (4.7 in) guns	1,190	38	23 December 1937	TA43 was scuttled at Trieste on 30 April or 1 May 1945.
Ljubljana	Kingdom of Yugoslavia	4 × Škoda 12 cm (4.7 in) guns	1,190	38	28 June 1938	Lubiana was sunk (or stranded and declared a total loss) off the Tunisian coast in April 1943.
Zagreb	Kingdom of Yugoslavia	4 × Škoda 12 cm (4.7 in) guns	1,190	38	30 March 1938	Zagreb was scuttled at the Bay of Kotor on 17 April 1941.

== Corvette ==
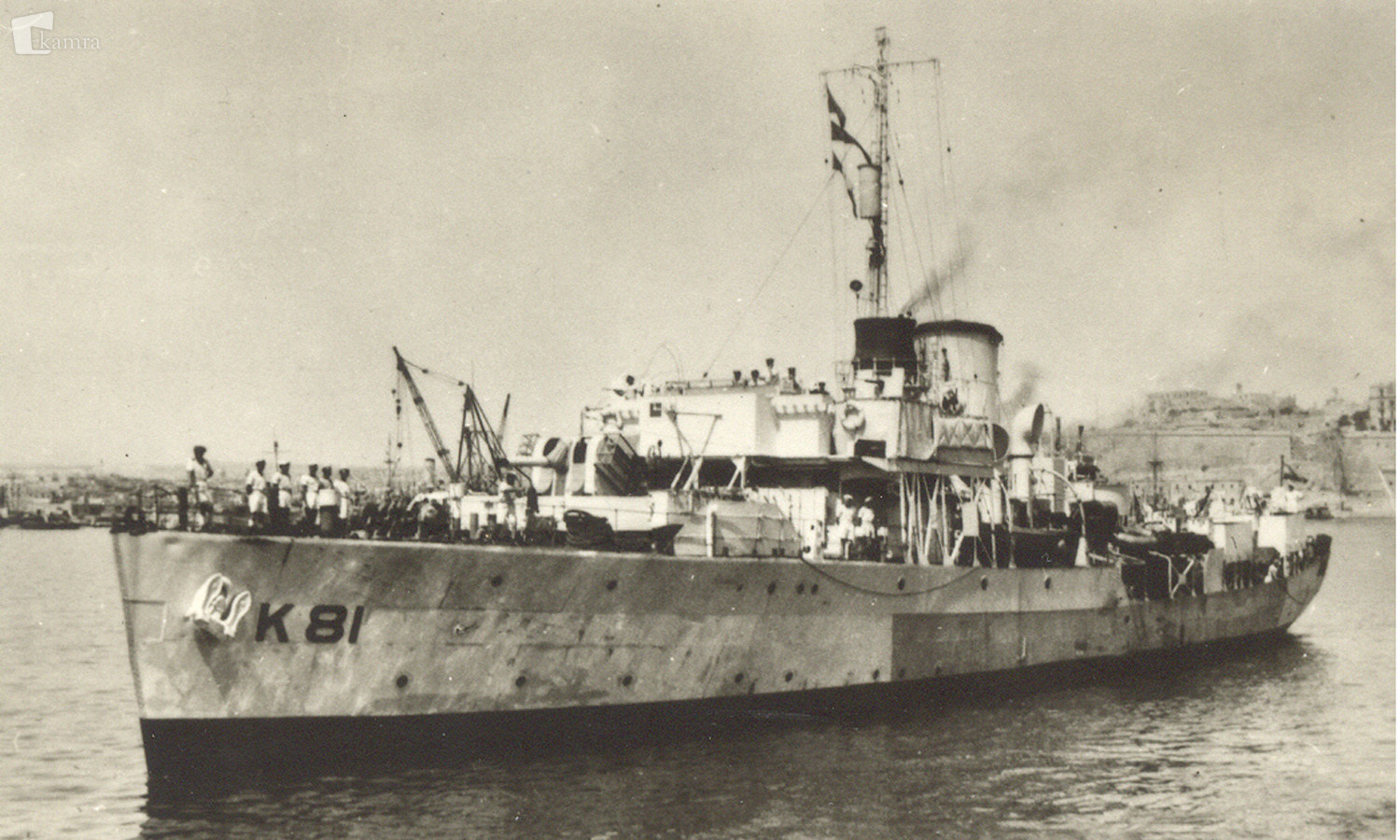
A Flower-class corvette Nada (HMS Mallow K81)

In early 1944, the Royal Navy Flower-class corvette HMS Mallow was transferred to the Royal Yugoslav Navy-in-exile (KM-in-exile) and renamed Nada. At the conclusion of the war she was transferred to the new Yugoslav Navy and renamed Partizanka.

Ship/vessel	Origin	Primary armament	Displacement in long tons	Maximum speed in knots	In service	Fate
Nada	United Kingdom	1 × 10.2 cm (4.0 in) gun	925	16	early 1944	Partizanka was returned to the United Kingdom in 1949.

== Gunboat and royal yacht ==
The gunboat and royal yacht Beli Orao came into service in 1939 and was captured by the Italians in April 1941 during the invasion. She saw service with the Italians as Alba then Zagabria before being returned to the KM-in-exile in late 1943. She survived the war and was transferred to the new Yugoslav Navy.

Ship/vessel	Origin	Primary armament	Displacement in long tons	Maximum speed in knots	In service	Fate
Beli Orao	Italy	2 × 4 cm (1.6 in) anti-aircraft guns	558	18.5	June 1939	Unknown

== Torpedo boats ==
=== 250t class ===
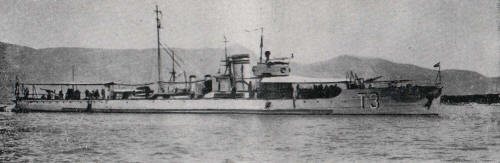
The Yugoslav torpedo boat T3 photographed in 1931

Eight former Austro-Hungarian 250t-class torpedo boats were transferred to the KM in 1921, and were the KM's only modern sea-going warships when it was formed. Two were lost or scrapped prior to World War II, and the rest were captured by the Italians during the 1941 Axis invasion and put into service by them. After the Italian capitulation, two were returned to the KM-in-exile. A further ship was sunk by German aircraft while still in Italian hands, and another was scuttled by her Italian crew. Of the remaining two, one was transferred to the Navy of the Independent State of Croatia and was sunk in 1944, and the other served in the German Navy as TA48 and was sunk in early 1945. The two boats that were returned to the KM-in-exile were transferred to the Yugoslav Navy at the end of the war and served as Golešnica and Cer.

Ship/vessel	Origin	Primary armament	Displacement in long tons	Maximum speed in knots	In service	Fate
T1	Austria-Hungary	4 × 45 cm (17.7 in) torpedo tubes	258–266	28	March 1921	Golešnica was scrapped in 1959.
T2	Austria-Hungary	4 × 45 cm (17.7 in) torpedo tubes	258–266	28	March 1921	T2 was scrapped in 1939.
T3	Austria-Hungary	4 × 45 cm (17.7 in) torpedo tubes	258–266	28	March 1921	TA48 was sunk in Trieste by Allied aircraft in February 1945.
T4	Austria-Hungary	4 × 45 cm (17.7 in) torpedo tubes	258–266	28	March 1921	T4 ran aground and became a total loss in 1932.
T5	Austria-Hungary	4 × 45 cm (17.7 in) torpedo tubes	258–266	28	March 1921	Cer was scrapped in 1962.
T6	Austria-Hungary	4 × 45 cm (17.7 in) torpedo tubes	258–266	28	March 1921	T6 was scuttled at Rimini in September 1943.
T7	Austria-Hungary	4 × 45 cm (17.7 in) torpedo tubes	258–266	28	March 1921	T7 was sunk off Murter Island in June 1944.
T8	Austria-Hungary	4 × 45 cm (17.7 in) torpedo tubes	258–266	28	March 1921	T8 was sunk by German aircraft in September 1943.

=== Kaiman class ===
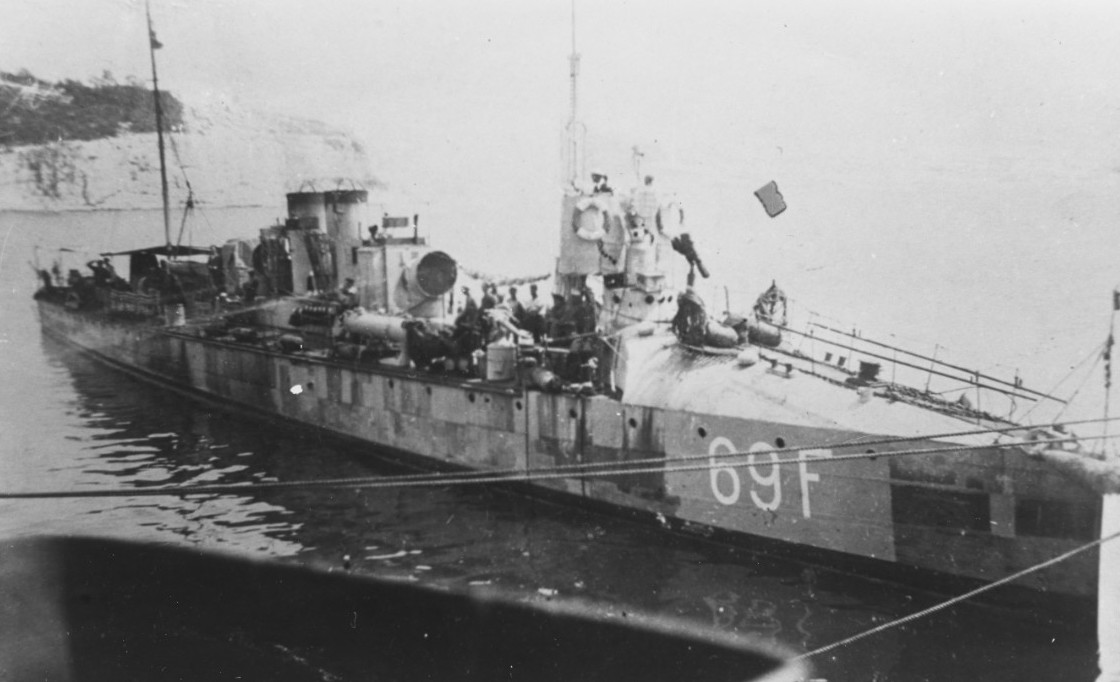
A Kaiman-class torpedo boat in Austro-Hungarian service

Four former Austro-Hungarian Kaiman-class torpedo boats were transferred to the KM in 1921, but all four were discarded and broken up between 1928 and 1930.

Ship/vessel	Origin	Primary armament	Displacement in long tons	Maximum speed in knots	In service	Fate
T9	Austria-Hungary	3 × 45 cm (17.7 in) torpedo tubes	206–208	26	March 1921	All four boats were scrapped between 1928 and 1930.
T10	Austria-Hungary	3 × 45 cm (17.7 in) torpedo tubes	206–208	26	March 1921	All four boats were scrapped between 1928 and 1930.
T11	Austria-Hungary	3 × 45 cm (17.7 in) torpedo tubes	206–208	26	March 1921	All four boats were scrapped between 1928 and 1930.
T12	Austria-Hungary	3 × 45 cm (17.7 in) torpedo tubes	206–208	26	March 1921	All four boats were scrapped between 1928 and 1930.

== Motor torpedo boats ==
=== Uskok class ===
Two British-built Uskok-class torpedo boats were acquired by the KM in 1927. Both were captured by the Italians during the April 1941 invasion. Placed into service with new designations, they were both were lost or stricken while in Italian service.

Ship/vessel	Origin	Primary armament	Displacement in long tons	Maximum speed in knots	In service	Fate
Uskok	United Kingdom	2 × 45.6 cm (18 in) torpedo tubes	15	40	1927	The renamed MAS 1 D sank near Mljet in April 1942.
Četnik	United Kingdom	2 × 45.6 cm (18 in) torpedo tubes	15	40	1927	The renamed MS 47 was struck off in September 1943.

=== Orjen class ===
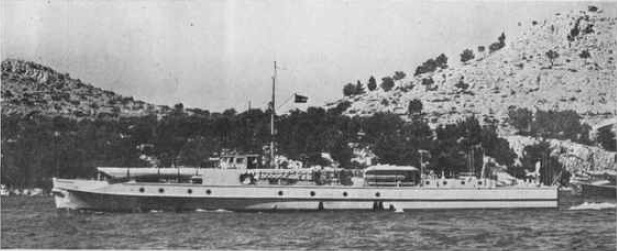
The Orjen-class torpedo boat Velebit in 1939

Eight German-built Orjen-class torpedo boats were purchased from Nazi Germany in the mid-to-late 1930s. Two escaped during the invasion of Yugoslavia in April 1941, and became part of the KM-in-exile. The remaining six were captured by the Italians and put into service by them under new designations. Two were scuttled by their crews at the time of the Italian capitulation in September 1943, and the remaining four were captured by the Germans and renamed. All four were scuttled at Salonika in October 1944. The boats that had escaped were transferred to the Yugoslav Navy at the end of the war.

Ship/vessel	Origin	Primary armament	Displacement in long tons	Maximum speed in knots	In service	Fate
Orjen	Germany	2 × 55 cm (22 in) torpedo tubes	61	31	1936	The renamed MS 41 was scuttled at Monfalcone in September 1943.
Durmitor	Germany	2 × 55 cm (22 in) torpedo tubes	61	31	Unknown	The renamed TČ 391 was struck off in 1963.
Suvobor	Germany	2 × 55 cm (22 in) torpedo tubes	61	31	1937	The renamed MS 45 was scuttled at Cattolica in September 1943.
Kajmakčalan	Germany	2 × 55 cm (22 in) torpedo tubes	61	31	Unknown	The renamed TČ 392 was struck off in 1963.
Velebit	Germany	2 × 55 cm (22 in) torpedo tubes	61	31	Unknown	All four boats were sunk at Salonika in October 1944.
Dinara	Germany	2 × 55 cm (22 in) torpedo tubes	61	31	1939	All four boats were sunk at Salonika in October 1944.
Rudnik	Germany	2 × 55 cm (22 in) torpedo tubes	61	31	1939	All four boats were sunk at Salonika in October 1944.
Triglav	Germany	2 × 55 cm (22 in) torpedo tubes	61	31	1939	All four boats were sunk at Salonika in October 1944.

== Submarines ==
=== Hrabri class ===
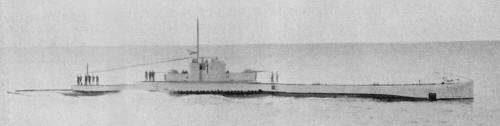
Hrabri underway

Two British-made Hrabri-class submarines were brought into service in 1927. During the April 1941 invasion, one escaped to join the KM-in-exile, while the other was captured by the Italians then scrapped. The boat that escaped was used as an anti-submarine warfare training vessel, and was transferred to the Yugoslav Navy at the end of the war and renamed Tara.

Ship/vessel	Origin	Primary armament	Displacement in long tons	Maximum speed in knots	In service	Fate
Hrabri	United Kingdom	6 × 53.3 cm (21 in) torpedo tubes	975 (surfaced)	15.7 (surfaced)	1927	Hrabri was scrapped by the Italians in 1941.
Nebojša	United Kingdom	6 × 53.3 cm (21 in) torpedo tubes	975 (surfaced)	15.7 (surfaced)	1927	Tara was struck off in 1954.

=== Osvetnik class ===
Two French-made Osvetnik-class submarines were commissioned in 1928–1929. Both were captured by the Italians during the April 1941 invasion, after which they were put into service as training and experimentation boats under new names. They were both scuttled at the time of the Italian capitulation.

Ship/vessel	Origin	Primary armament	Displacement in long tons	Maximum speed in knots	In service	Fate
Osvetnik	France	6 × 55 cm (22 in) torpedo tubes	630 (surfaced)	14.5 (surfaced)	1929	The renamed Francesco Rismondo was scuttled at Bonifacio in September 1943.
Smeli	France	6 × 55 cm (22 in) torpedo tubes	630 (surfaced)	14.5 (surfaced)	1928	The renamed Antonio Bajamonti was scuttled at La Spezia in September 1943.

== Minelayers ==
=== Galeb class ===
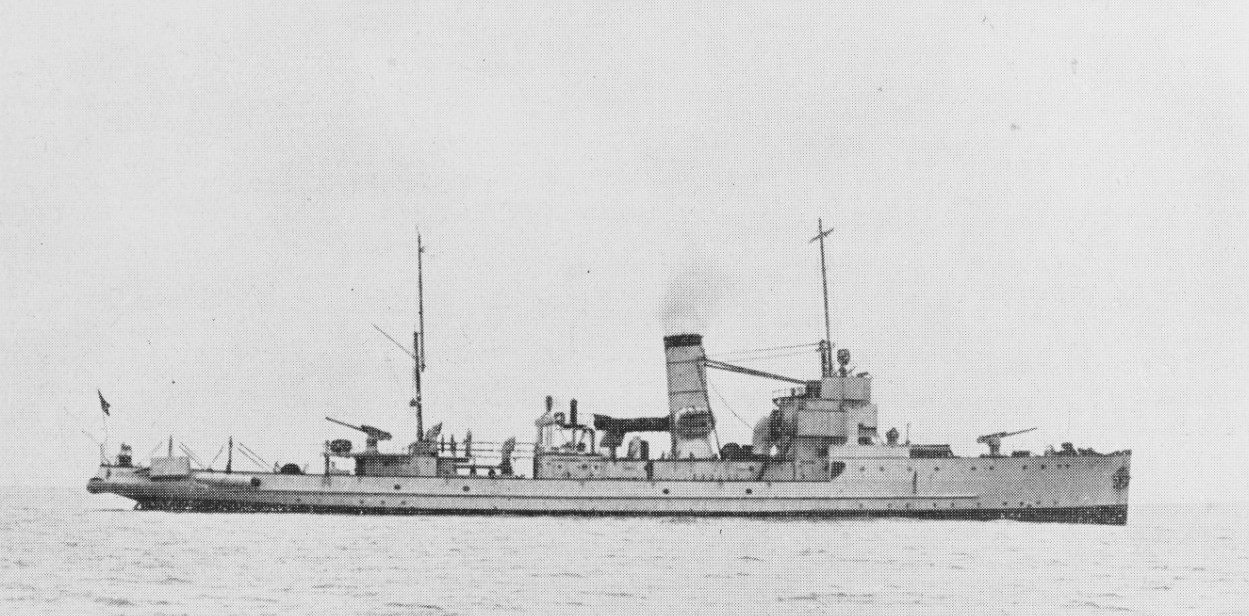
An Italian minesweeper similar to the Galeb class

Six German-built Galeb-class minelayers were purchased soon after the KM was established. All six were captured by the Italians during the April 1941 invasion, and were put into service by them under new names. Five were lost prior to the Italian capitulation in September 1943, but one was transferred to the KM-in-exile in December of that year, and survived the war to serve in the post-war Yugoslav Navy as Pionir then Zelengora.

Ship/vessel	Origin	Primary armament	Displacement in long tons	Maximum speed in knots	In service	Fate
Galeb	Germany	2 × Škoda 9 cm (3.5 in) L/45 guns	500	16	July 1921	The renamed Selve was broken up in 1948.
Orao	Germany	2 × Škoda 9 cm (3.5 in) L/45 guns	500	16	July 1921	The renamed Zelengora was disposed of in 1962.
Labud	Germany	2 × Škoda 9 cm (3.5 in) L/45 guns	500	16	July 1921	The renamed Oriole was scuttled in July 1943.
Jastreb	Germany	2 × Škoda 9 cm (3.5 in) L/45 guns	500	16	July 1921	The renamed Zirona was destroyed by her own crew in November 1941.
Kobac	Germany	2 × Škoda 9 cm (3.5 in) L/45 guns	500	16	July 1921	The renamed Unie was destroyed in January 1943.
Sokol	Germany	2 × Škoda 9 cm (3.5 in) L/45 guns	500	16	July 1921	The renamed Eso was sunk in January 1943.

=== Zmaj ===
The German-built seaplane tender Zmaj was commissioned into the KM in 1930, but was converted to a minelayer in 1937. Captured by the Germans in April 1941, she saw service in the seaplane tender, aircraft rescue and troop transport roles as Drache. In late 1942, she was re-commissioned as a minelayer, and was used for shipboard trials with helicopters in 1943 before being sunk in September 1944.

Ship/vessel	Origin	Primary armament	Displacement in long tons	Maximum speed in knots	In service	Fate
Zmaj	Germany	2 × 8.35 cm (3.29 in) L/55 anti-aircraft guns	1,840	15	1930	Drache was sunk in September 1944.

=== Malinska class ===
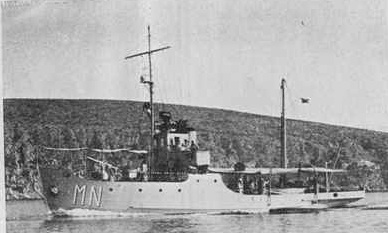
The Malinska-class minelayer Marjan in 1939

In 1931, the KM acquired five former Austro-Hungarian minelayers, known as the Malinska class. In April 1941, they were all captured by the Italians, although one had been scuttled, it was raised and repaired. Two were captured by the Germans at the time of the Italian capitulation in September 1943, and were lost in their hands or while serving with the Navy of the Independent State of Croatia. Three were handed back to the KM-in-exile and survived the war to see service in the new Yugoslav Navy.

Ship/vessel	Origin	Primary armament	Displacement in long tons	Maximum speed in knots	In service	Fate
Malinska	Austria-Hungary	1 × 6.6 cm (2.6 in) L/30 anti-aircraft gun	126	9	1931	Unknown
Marjan	Austria-Hungary	1 × 6.6 cm (2.6 in) L/30 anti-aircraft gun	126	9	1931	The renamed Ugliano was probably lost in German hands.
Meljine	Austria-Hungary	1 × 6.6 cm (2.6 in) L/30 anti-aircraft gun	126	9	1931	Unknown
Mljet	Austria-Hungary	1 × 6.6 cm (2.6 in) L/30 anti-aircraft gun	126	9	1931	Unknown
Mosor	Austria-Hungary	1 × 6.6 cm (2.6 in) L/30 anti-aircraft gun	126	9	1931	The renamed Pasman was scrapped in 1954.

== Minesweepers ==
At the time of its formation in 1921, the KM obtained four former Austro-Hungarian Schichau-class torpedo boats that had been converted into minesweepers. Three were discarded soon after, but one served as a training vessel until the April 1941 invasion, at which time she was captured by the Italians. The Germans captured her in September 1943 and she was lost in their hands some time later.

Ship/vessel	Origin	Primary armament	Displacement in long tons	Maximum speed in knots	In service	Fate
D1	Austria-Hungary	2 × 3.7 cm (1.5 in) L/23 guns	87–89	19	March 1921	D1 was discarded in 1924.
D2	Austria-Hungary	2 × 3.7 cm (1.5 in) L/23 guns	87–89	19	March 1921	D2 was lost in German hands.
D3	Austria-Hungary	2 × 3.7 cm (1.5 in) L/23 guns	87–89	19	March 1921	These two boats were also discarded in 1924.
D4	Austria-Hungary	2 × 3.7 cm (1.5 in) L/23 guns	87–89	19	March 1921	These two boats were also discarded in 1924.

== Submarine tenders ==
Two submarine tenders were operated by the KM, one was converted from a German-built water tanker obtained from the Austro-Hungarians, and the other was a British commercial vessel converted to the role at the time British-built submarines were acquired. The latter ship was captured by the Italians in April 1941 but survived the war to see service in the post-war Yugoslav Navy.

Ship/vessel	Origin	Displacement in long tons	In service	Fate
Sitnica	German Empire	370	March 1921	Unknown
Hvar	United Kingdom	2,600	1927	Hvar was scrapped in 1953.

== Salvage ships ==
The KM operated two salvage ships. The first was a former Austro-Hungarian vessel which was scrapped in the late 1920s. She was replaced by a German-built ship.

Ship/vessel	Origin	Displacement in long tons	In service	Fate
Moćni	Austria-Hungary	265	March 1921	Moćni was scrapped in 1929.
Spasilac	Germany	740	1929	Captured by the Italian Royal Navy at Split on 22 April 1941 and renamed Instancabile. Returned to the Yugoslav navy in 1945.

== Tankers ==
The KM had two tankers, one for oil and one for water. The oil tanker was sunk in Italian hands in 1943, and the water tanker was deleted at the end of the war.

Ship/vessel	Origin	Displacement in long tons	In service	Fate
Lovćen	Unknown	561	1932	Lovćen was deleted in 1945.
Perun	Belgium	4,500	1939	Perun was sunk in March 1943.

== River flotilla ==
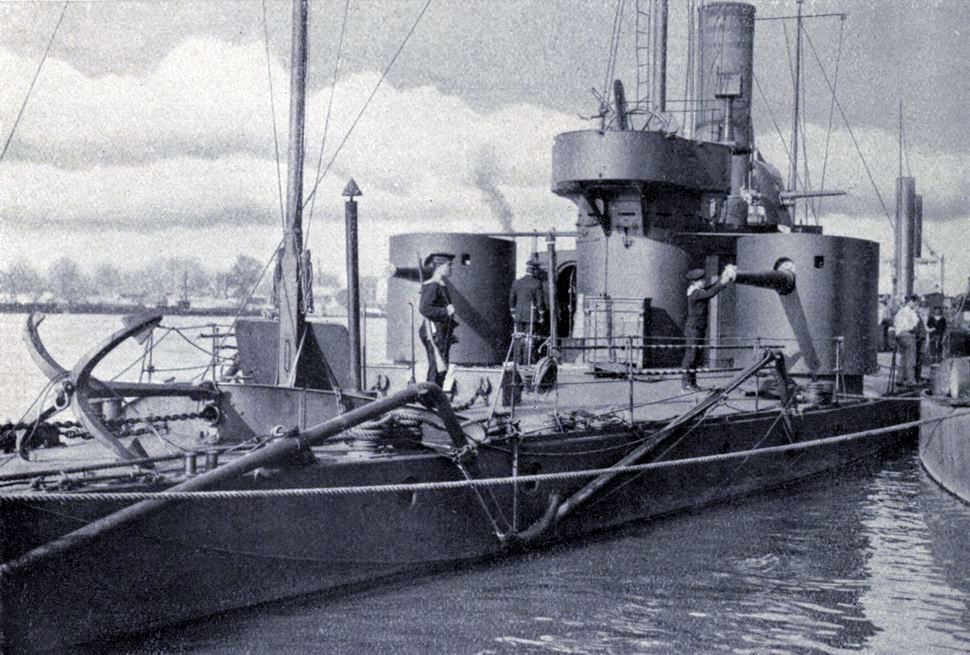
Sava as the Austro-Hungarian SMS Bodrog in 1914

The KM inherited four river monitors from the Austro-Hungarian Navy, each from a different class. In April 1941, one was sunk, and the rest were scuttled. One of the scuttled ships was raised and scrapped. The other two were raised and put to use by the Navy of the Independent State of Croatia, and were lost late in the war, with one being raised after the war and put into service until 1962.

Ship/vessel	Origin	Primary armament	Displacement in long tons	Maximum speed in knots	In service	Fate
Vardar	Austria-Hungary	2 × 12 cm (4.7 in) L/45 guns 2 × 12 cm L/10 howitzers	570	13.5	March 1921	Vardar was scuttled in April 1941.
Sava	Austria-Hungary	2 × 12 cm L/35 guns 1 × 12 cm L/10 howitzer	430	13	March 1921	Sava was struck in 1962. Currently a museum ship in Belgrade.
Drava	Austria-Hungary	2 × 12 cm L/45 guns 3 × 12 cm L/10 howitzers	528	13	March 1921	Drava was raised by Hungary and scrapped during the war.
Morava	Austria-Hungary	2 × 12 cm L/35 guns	441	10	March 1921	The renamed Bosna was mined in June 1944

== See also ==
- List of ships of the Yugoslav Navy
