= Osvetnik-class submarine =

Class of Yugoslav Royal Navy submarines

Osvetnik class
- Osvetnik, the lead submarine of the class, underway in 1930

Class overview
- Builders: Ateliers et Chantiers de la Loire, Nantes, France
- Operators: Royal Yugoslav Navy; Regia Marina
- Preceded by: Hrabri-class submarine
- Succeeded by: Sutjeska-class submarine
- Built: 1928–1929
- In commission: 1928–1943
- Completed: 2
- Lost: 2

General characteristics
- Type: Diesel-electric submarine
- Displacement: 630 long tons (640 t) (surfaced); 809 long tons (822 t) (submerged)
- Length: 66.4 m (217 ft 10 in) (oa)
- Beam: 5.4 m (17 ft 9 in)
- Draught: 3.9 m (12 ft 10 in)
- Propulsion: 2 × shaft MAN diesel engines 1,480 bhp (1,100 kW); 2 × CGE electric motors 1,100 shp (820 kW)
- Speed: 14.5 knots (26.9 km/h) (diesel); 9.25 knots (17.13 km/h) (electric)
- Range: 5,000 nautical miles (9,300 km; 5,800 mi) at 9 knots (17 km/h; 10 mph) (surfaced); 100 nautical miles (190 km; 120 mi) at 4.55 knots (8.43 km/h; 5.24 mph) (submerged)
- Test depth: 60–80 m (200–260 ft)
- Complement: 44–45
- Armament: 6 × 550 mm (22 in) torpedo tubes (4 × bow, 2 × stern); 12 × torpedoes or 25 × sea mines; 1 × 100 mm (3.9 in) L/35 gun; 1 × 40 mm (1.6 in) L/67 anti-aircraft gun

The Osvetnik class consisted of two submarines built for the Kingdom of Serbs, Croats and Slovenes – Yugoslavia from 1929 on – by Ateliers et Chantiers de la Loire in Nantes, France. Launched in 1928 and 1929, the boats were named Osvetnik (Avenger) and Smeli (Courageous). They were built to a partial double hull Simonot design similar to the French Circé-class submarines. Also known as the Smeli class, they were the second class of submarines to serve in the Royal Yugoslav Navy, and after extensive sea trials and testing they sailed from France to the Adriatic coast of Yugoslavia, arriving in December 1929, where they joined the two larger British-made Hrabri-class submarines to make up the pre-war Yugoslav submarine flotilla. The Osvetnik-class were armed with six 550 mm (22 in) torpedo tubes, one 100 mm (3.9 in) gun, and one 40 mm (1.6 in) anti-aircraft gun, and could dive to 80 metres (260 ft).

Prior to World War II both submarines participated in cruises to Mediterranean ports. Both submarines were captured by Italian forces at the Bay of Kotor during the German-led Axis invasion of Yugoslavia in April 1941. After refit, they saw service as experimental and training vessels with the Regia Marina as Francesco Rismondo and Antonio Bajamonti respectively, and participated in few combat patrols. They were both scuttled in September 1943 following the Italian surrender, Francesco Rismondo by the Germans following her capture, and Antonio Bajamonti by the Italians themselves. They were both raised and scrapped in 1947.

== Background ==
The naval policy of the Kingdom of Serbs, Croats and Slovenes (the Kingdom of Yugoslavia from 1929) lacked direction until the mid-1920s, although it was generally accepted by the armed forces that the Adriatic coastline was effectively a sea frontier that the naval arm was responsible for securing with the limited resources made available to it. A few naval officers attended submarine warfare courses in the United Kingdom and France in the hope that funds might be forthcoming from the government to create a submarine arm for the navy. In 1925, King Alexander visited the navy for the first time and several senior naval officers suggested to him that a submarine arm was needed. In the middle of 1926, the British L-class submarine HMS L53 visited the Adriatic to familiarise Yugoslav naval officers with the class and undergo trials to demonstrate its capabilities. In the same year, a modest ten-year construction program was finally initiated to build up a force of submarines, coastal torpedo boats, torpedo bombers and conventional bomber aircraft for coastal defence. The two British Hrabri-class submarines, based on a modified L-class design, were some of the first new acquisitions aimed at developing a naval force capable of meeting this challenge.

The Yugoslav interest in French submarines continued throughout the early 1920s, and there were vocal opponents of the purchase of the Hrabri class from those who had been trained in France and favoured the French product. In April 1927, two French submarines were ordered from the Ateliers et Chantiers de la Loire company (ACL) at Nantes. The design of the Osvetnik-class was based on a partial double hull design developed by ACL's chief engineer, G. Simonot, which was similar to the French Circé-class submarine. Their Serbo-Croatian names of Osvetnik and Smeli translate as "Avenger" and "Courageous" respectively. Most French submarines used Schneider-Vickers diesel engines, but the Osvetnik class were ordered with Swiss-made MAN engines. One of the concerns of the Yugoslav submariners was about the French insistence on mounting some torpedo tubes on swivel mounts on the deck outside the watertight hull to meet a tactical requirement that they be able to launch torpedoes in every direction. According to the Yugoslav naval historian Zvonimir Freivogel, this aversion to externally-mounted torpedo tubes was probably due to negative World War I experiences of former Austro-Hungarian Navy naval officers with U-14, a captured French Brumaire-class submarine. As a result, the Osvetnik class were ordered with all the torpedo tubes inside the watertight hull. The other major change was that more powerful Skoda 100-millimetre (3.9 in) guns were installed instead of French 75 mm (3.0 in) ones. Despite these modifications, the French submarines cost the Yugoslavs half as much as the British Hrabri-class boats.

== Description and construction ==
=== General ===
The Osvetnik-class boats had a partial double-hull with a straight flush deck which was slanted aft, and a raked stern. The outer hull was boat-shaped to enhance seakeeping while surfaced, and the inner hull was shaped like a spindle. The submarines had two shafts each driving a four-bladed propeller. The rudder was located between the propellers, and the aft hydroplanes were positioned on either side of the propellers. The forward hydroplanes were deep below the waterline, and the ballast and diving tanks were positioned between the outer and inner hull. The conning tower with a navigation bridge was located in the centre of the deck. Forward of the conning tower was the gun platform for the main gun, with the anti-aircraft gun positioned aft of the conning tower. One aspect of French boats was that instead of an electric stove installed in a galley inside the boat, a coal-fired stove was installed in the aft part of the conning tower. This meant that hot food could only be cooked for the ratings in harbour or in calm seas. The deck was wide enough to allow the crew to walk along it while underway, and was wider around the conning tower and main gun platform. Forward of the main gun, a ship's boat was stored under the deck planks. Both fore and aft of the conning tower on the port side, a folding telescoping radio mast was stored in a cradle. These masts could be raised and radio antennas stretched between the two.

The inner hull was divided into six watertight compartments by transverse bulkheads. The first compartment housed the four bow torpedo tubes, along with compressed air flasks and bunks for 15 of the crew. The upper section of the second compartment was accommodation for the senior petty officers, along with their toilet, a cooking plate and small vegetable store. The lower level contained the forward electric batteries. The third compartment was also divided into two levels, with the lower level housing some batteries along with the ammunition magazine, and the upper section containing the captain's cabin, the control room, a small cabin for two officers, a small salon with a capacity of two, and the radio room. Above the third compartment was the conning tower, which mounted three periscopes, two of which were placed side-by-side. The conning tower also supported a short-range radio antenna that stretched to the bow and stern. The fourth compartment contained the diesel engines on the upper level, with fuel tanks below. The fifth compartment housed the electric motors, with an air compressor installed below. The stern-most compartment contained the aft torpedo tubes, bunks for 14 crew, the potable water tank, electric steering machinery, and liquid oxygen and compressed air flasks.

The Osvetnik-class boats had an overall length of 66.5 m (218 ft 2 in), a beam of 5.4 m (17 ft 9 in), and a surfaced draught of 3.77 m (12 ft 4 in). Their surfaced displacement was 630 long tons (640 t), or 809 long tons (822 t) submerged, and their crews consisted of 44–45 officers and enlisted men. They had an operational depth of 60 m (200 ft) and a maximum permitted depth of 80 m (260 ft), and could dive to periscope depth in 35 seconds, far quicker than the Hrabri-class boats.

=== Propulsion ===
For surface running, the two 740 brake horsepower (550 kW) MAN diesel engines were rated at a combined 1,480 bhp (1,100 kW). The engines were made by the Swiss branch of MAN based in Schaffhausen. The boats could reach a top speed of 14.5 knots (26.9 km/h) on the surface. The French submarine designers who were responsible for the Osvetnik class were opposed to placing fuel tanks outside the watertight hull, similar French submarines of the period were only able to carry small quantities of fuel, between 60–65 t (59–64 long tons; 66–72 short tons). The modifications made to the Osvetnik class meant that fuel storage was reduced even further, to a mere 25 t (25 long tons; 28 short tons). This gave the boats a maximum endurance of 5,000 nmi (9,300 km; 5,800 mi) at 9 kn (17 km/h; 10 mph) on the surface on diesel engines, but at maximum speed this reduced to only 700 nmi (1,300 km; 810 mi).

When submerged, the propellers were driven by two La Compagnie Générale d'Electricité electric motors generating a total of 1,100 shaft horsepower (820 kW). The battery storage consisted of 120 Tudor batteries, which had a combined weight of 90 t (89 long tons; 99 short tons). The boats could reach 9.2 knots (17.0 km/h) on their electric motors when submerged, but only for short periods. On electric motors alone, the boats had a range of 100 nmi (190 km; 120 mi) at 4.5 kn (8.3 km/h; 5.2 mph).

=== Armament ===
The boats were fitted with four 550 mm (22 in) torpedo tubes in the bow and two in the stern, with a total of twelve torpedoes. The torpedoes were of the St. Tropez 1924 Model V type, and were 6.6 m (22 ft) long, and weighed 1,490 kg (3,280 lb) with a 310 kg (680 lb) TNT warhead. They had a range of 4,000 m (13,000 ft) at 45 kn (83 km/h; 52 mph) or 8,000 m (26,000 ft) at 35 kn (65 km/h; 40 mph). In lieu of torpedoes, 25 sea mines could be carried inside the torpedo tubes. The single 100 mm L/35 gun mounted on each boat had been ordered from Škoda for Austro-Hungarian submarines that were not completed at the end of World War I, and had been placed in storage in Czechoslovakia by Škoda. They were sold to the Yugoslavs at a good price. The boats were also equipped with one semi-automatic Škoda 40 mm (1.6 in) L/67 anti-aircraft gun of the same type as those mounted on the flotilla leader Dubrovnik.

== Service history ==
Smeli was launched on 1 December 1928, the 10th anniversary of the establishment of the Kingdom of the Serbs, Croats and Slovenes, and was christened by the wife of the Yugoslav ambassador to France, Dr. Miroslav Spalajković. Osvetnik was launched on 14 January 1929 and christened by the wife of the military envoy to France. Both boats were completed in 1929. Their names were painted in large letters on the sides of their conning towers, in Latin script on the port side and in Cyrillic script on the starboard side. They were also given tactical numbers, 3 for Smeli and 4 for Osvetnik, which were also painted on the aft section of their conning towers on both sides.

Over the winter of 1928/1929, the crews for both boats underwent an intensive French language course aboard the submarine tender Hvar, and after additional specialist training they travelled to Nantes in two groups in early 1929. As soon as each submarine was completed, it sailed from Nantes to Brest in Brittany for diving trials. In September they sailed to Saint-Tropez on the Mediterranean coast of France to take onboard their torpedoes, then underwent torpedo trials. During one firing from an aft tube on Smeli the torpedo filled with water and sank. Investigations of the salvaged torpedo revealed that the leading rail edge in the torpedo tube had damaged a valve in the nose of the torpedo causing it to fill with water. As a result, all leading rail edges were rounded. Following these trials the boats were sent to the large French naval base at Toulon, also on the southern coast of France, where they were docked and the underwater parts of their hulls were cleaned. They were officially delivered to the Royal Yugoslav Navy (Note: This translates to Serbo-Croatian Latin: Kraljevska mornarica; Serbo-Croatian Cyrillic: Краљевска морнарица.) on 26 November 1929. The former Austro-Hungarian water carrier Sitnica was rebuilt to be utilised as a mothership, mainly with the Osvetnik-class submarines, although Hvar also filled this role.

They arrived in the Bay of Kotor on the southern Adriatic coast on 9 December 1929. In 1932, the British naval attaché reported that Yugoslav ships engaged in few exercises, manoeuvres or gunnery training due to reduced budgets, but both submarines were in service almost constantly, with the exception of brief overhauls.

=== Osvetnik ===
First of the class, Osvetnik was involved in a series of visits to Mediterranean ports during the interwar period. She was captured in port by the Italians during the German-led Axis invasion of Yugoslavia. She was overhauled and rebuilt before being commissioned by the Italians as Francesco Rismondo, but was mainly used for training and experimentation, conducting just a dozen war patrols. After the Italian surrender, she was captured then scuttled by the Germans near Bonifacio on the southern tip of the island of Corsica in September 1943, and was raised and scrapped in 1947.

=== Smeli ===
Smeli was the second and last of her class. She also participated in several cruises in the Mediterranean during the interwar period. During the invasion, Smeli accompanied the Hrabri-class boat Nebojša on a fruitless patrol of the lower Adriatic. After capture by the Italians, Smeli was also refitted and modernised before being commissioned as Antonio Bajamonti but like Francesco Rismondo was predominantly used for training and experimentation. The submarine did participate in a few war patrols in 1942. She was scuttled by the Italians at La Spezia in September 1943 at the time of the Italian surrender, and was raised and scrapped in 1947.

== See also ==
- List of ships of the Royal Yugoslav Navy
