= Yugoslav submarine Osvetnik =

Yugoslav Osvetnik-class diesel-electric submarine

Osvetnik
- Osvetnik underway in 1930

History

Kingdom of Yugoslavia
- Name: Osvetnik
- Namesake: Avenger
- Builder: Ateliers et Chantiers de la Loire, Nantes, France
- Launched: 14 January 1929
- In service: 1929–1941
- Out of service: 1941

Italy
- Name: Francesco Rismondo
- Namesake: Francesco Rismondo
- Acquired: Captured on 17 April 1941
- In service: 1941–43
- Out of service: 18 September 1943
- Fate: Scuttled by the Germans at Bonifacio after capture

General characteristics
- Class & type: Osvetnik-class diesel-electric submarine
- Displacement: 630 long tons (640 t) (surfaced); 809 long tons (822 t) (submerged)
- Length: 66.5 m (218 ft 2 in)
- Beam: 5.4 m (17 ft 9 in)
- Draught: 3.8 m (12 ft 6 in)
- Propulsion: 2 × shaft MAN diesel engines 1,480 bhp (1,100 kW), 2 × Nancy electric motors 1,000 shp (750 kW)
- Speed: 14.5 knots (26.9 km/h) (surfaced); 9.2 knots (17.0 km/h; 10.6 mph) (submerged)
- Range: 3,500 nautical miles (6,500 km; 4,000 mi) at 9 knots (17 km/h; 10 mph) (surfaced); 75 nmi (139 km; 86 mi) at 5 knots (9.3 km/h; 5.8 mph) (submerged)
- Test depth: 80 m (260 ft)
- Complement: 43
- Armament: 6 × 550 mm (22 in) torpedo tubes (4 × bow, 2 × stern); 1 × 100 mm (3.9 in) gun; 1 × 40 mm (1.6 in) anti-aircraft gun

Osvetnik (Avenger) was the first of the Osvetnik-class diesel-electric submarines built by Ateliers et Chantiers de la Loire, Nantes, France for the navy of the Kingdom of Serbs, Croats and Slovenes (later Yugoslavia). She was launched in 1929, and was built to a partial double hull Simonot design similar to the French Circé-class submarines. She was armed with six 550 mm (22-inch) torpedo tubes, one 100 mm (3.9 in) gun, and one 40 mm (1.6 in) anti-aircraft gun, and could dive to 80 metres (260 ft).

Prior to World War II she participated in several cruises to Mediterranean ports. During the German-led Axis invasion of Yugoslavia in April 1941, she was captured by Italian forces at the Bay of Kotor. Initially designated N1, her armament was changed and her conning tower modified. Due to her age and shallow diving depth, when she was commissioned into the Royal Italian Navy as Francesco Rismondo; her service was limited to training and experimentation. She was scuttled off the island of Corsica by the Germans shortly after her capture in September 1943 following the Italian surrender.

== Description and construction ==
Yugoslav naval policy in the interwar period lacked direction until the mid-1920s, although it was generally accepted that the Adriatic coastline was effectively a sea frontier that the naval arm was responsible for securing with the limited resources made available to it. In 1926, a modest ten-year construction program was initiated to build up a force of submarines, coastal torpedo boats, torpedo bombers and conventional bomber aircraft to perform this role. The Osvetnik-class submarines were one of the acquisitions aimed at developing a naval force capable of meeting this challenge.

Osvetnik was built for the Kingdom of Serbs, Croats and Slovenes (later Yugoslavia) by the Ateliers et Chantiers de la Loire company (ACL) at Nantes, France. Her partial double hull design, was based on plans by ACL's chief engineer, G. Simonot, and was similar to the French Circé-class submarines. Her Serbo-Croatian name translates as "Avenger". Along with her sister submarine Smeli, she had an overall length of 66.5 m (218 ft 2 in), a beam of 5.4 m (17 ft 9 in), and a surfaced draught of 3.8 m (12 ft 6 in). Her surfaced displacement was 630 long tons (640 t), or 809 long tons (822 t) submerged, and her crew consisted of 43 officers and enlisted men. She had an operational depth of 80 m (262 ft).

For surface running, the Osvetnik-class boats were powered by two MAN (Maschinenfabrik) diesel engines which were rated at 1,480 brake horsepower (1,100 kW) that drove two propeller shafts. When submerged, the propellers were driven by two Nancy electric motors generating 1,000 shaft horsepower (750 kW). They could reach a top speed of 14.5 knots (26.9 km/h) on the surface, and 9.2 knots (17.0 km/h) on their electric motors when submerged. They were armed with six 550 mm (22 in) torpedo tubes (four bow-mounted, two stern-mounted), one 100 mm (3.9 in) gun, and one 40 mm (1.6 in) anti-aircraft gun. On the surface, the boats had a range of 3,500 nautical miles (6,500 km) at 9 knots (17 km/h), and 75 nautical miles (139 km) at 5 knots (9.3 km/h) submerged.

== Service history ==
Osvetnik was the first of her class, and the third submarine of the navy of the Kingdom of Serbs, Croats and Slovenes, which subsequently became the Royal Yugoslav Navy. She was launched on 14 January 1929. She and her sister submarine Smeli arrived in the Bay of Kotor on 9 December 1929. In 1932, the British naval attaché reported that Yugoslav ships engaged in few exercises, manoeuvres or gunnery training due to reduced budgets. In September 1933, Osvetnik and the British-designed submarine Nebojša cruised the southern part of the central Mediterranean. In August 1935, Osvetnik visited Malta, this time in company with the British-designed submarine Hrabri. In August 1936, Nebojša and Osvetnik visited the Greek island of Corfu.

When the German-led Axis invasion of Yugoslavia began on 6 April 1941, she was located in the Bay of Kotor on the southern Adriatic coast along with the three other submarines of the Submarine Division. On 10 April, Osvetnik and Hrabri received orders for an operation against the Italian enclave of Zara on the Dalmatian coastline, but the mission did not proceed. On 17 April, she was captured by the Italian XVII Corps at the Bay of Kotor.

Still in good condition, she was taken as war booty, and initially designated N1 by the Royal Italian Navy. She was refitted and modernised at Pola in the upper Adriatic, which involved the replacement of some of her armament and modifications to her conning tower. After these modifications, her displacement was 665 long tons (676 t) (822 long tons (835 t) submerged). She was commissioned by the Italians as the Bajamonti-class Francesco Rismondo, named after Francesco Rismondo, a Dalmatian-born Italian hero of World War I. Despite her submerged stability and good diving rate of 35 seconds, her age and shallow diving depth meant that she was only used for training and experimentation. Shortly after the Italian surrender, she was captured by the Germans on 14 September 1943 at Bonifacio at the southern tip of the island of Corsica, and they scuttled her four days later.

== See also ==
- List of ships of the Royal Yugoslav Navy
