= Yugoslav submarine Nebojša =

Yugoslav submarine built in 1927

Nebojša
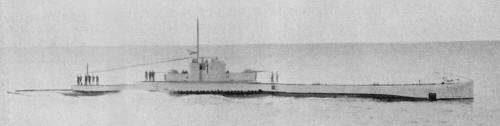
- Nebojša's sister submarine Hrabri underway in 1934

History

Kingdom of Yugoslavia
- Name: Nebojša
- Namesake: Fearless
- Builder: Vickers-Armstrong Naval Yard
- Launched: 1927
- In service: 1927–1945
- Out of service: 1945

Socialist Federal Republic of Yugoslavia
- Name: Tara
- Acquired: 1945
- Out of service: 1954
- Fate: Scrapped in 1958

General characteristics
- Class & type: Hrabri-class submarine
- Displacement: 975 long tons (991 t) (surfaced); 1,164 long tons (1,183 t) (submerged)
- Length: 72.1 m (236 ft 7 in) (oa)
- Beam: 7.31 m (24 ft)
- Draught: 4 m (13 ft)
- Propulsion: 2 × shafts; 2 × diesel engines 2,400 bhp (1,800 kW); 2 × electric motors 1,600 shp (1,200 kW)
- Speed: 15.7 knots (29.1 km/h; 18.1 mph) (diesel); 10 knots (19 km/h; 12 mph) (electric)
- Range: 5,000 nautical miles (9,300 km; 5,800 mi) at 9 knots (17 km/h; 10 mph) (surfaced)
- Test depth: 60 m (200 ft)
- Complement: 47
- Armament: 6 × 533 mm (21 in) torpedo tubes (bow); 12 × torpedoes; 2 × 102 mm (4 in) Mark IV L/40 guns; 1 × QF 2-pounder (40 mm (1.6 in)) L/39 anti-aircraft gun; 2 × machine guns

Nebojša was the second of the Hrabri-class submarines; built for the Kingdom of Serbs, Croats and Slovenes– Yugoslavia by the Vickers-Armstrong Naval Yard in the United Kingdom. Launched in 1927, her design was based on the British L-class submarine of World War I, and was built using parts from an L-class submarine that was never completed. The Hrabri-class were the first submarines to serve in the Royal Yugoslav Navy (KM), (Note: This translates to Serbo-Croatian Latin: Kraljevska mornarica; Serbo-Croatian Cyrillic: Краљевска морнарица. The navy's "KM" initialism is derived from these.) and after extensive sea trials and testing Nebojša sailed from the UK to the Adriatic coast of Yugoslavia, arriving in April 1928. The submarine was armed with six bow-mounted 533 mm (21 in) torpedo tubes, two 102 mm (4 in) deck guns, one QF 2-pounder (40 mm (1.6 in)) L/39 anti-aircraft gun and two machine guns. Its maximum diving depth was restricted to 55 metres (180 ft) by Yugoslav naval regulations.

Prior to World War II, Nebojša participated in cruises to Mediterranean ports. In 1930, Nebojša was damaged in a collision with a merchant ship. In 1933–1934 she was refitted, her superstructure was extensively modified and the 2-pounder gun was replaced with a single 13.2 mm (0.52 in) Hotchkiss M1929 anti-aircraft machine gun. By 1938 the class was considered to be obsolete, but efforts to replace them with modern German coastal submarines were stymied by the advent of World War II, and Nebojša remained in service.

Immediately before the April 1941 German-led Axis invasion of Yugoslavia, Hrabri conducted patrols in the Adriatic Sea. During the Axis invasion, Nebojša evaded capture and made it to Egypt to join the British Royal Navy (RN). Along with other vessels and crews that had escaped during the invasion, Nebojša formed part of the KM-in-exile, which operated out of eastern Mediterranean ports under the operational command of the RN. Nebojša was overhauled and initially served with RN submarine forces in the Mediterranean Sea as an anti-submarine warfare training boat. At the end of 1941 the RN prohibited her from diving and she was employed as a battery charging station for other submarines. In May 1942 her crew were removed and placed in a British military camp following a revolt by Yugoslav generals based in Egypt, and she received an almost entirely RN crew. Nebojša underwent another extensive overhaul by the RN, then she was briefly utilised for training in Beirut. The boat was formally handed back to the KM-in-exile in mid-1943, after which she underwent a further substantial refit. Nebojša eventually made her way to Malta where the headquarters of the KM-in-exile was then located. After the war in Europe ended, Nebojša was transferred to the new Yugoslav Navy and renamed Tara. She was used in a static training role until 1954, when she was stricken.

== Background ==
The naval policy of the Kingdom of Serbs, Croats and Slovenes (the Kingdom of Yugoslavia from 1929) lacked direction until the mid-1920s, although it was generally accepted by the armed forces that the Adriatic coastline was effectively a sea frontier that the naval arm was responsible for securing with the limited resources made available to it. In 1926, a modest ten-year construction program was initiated to build up a force of submarines, coastal torpedo boats, and torpedo and conventional bomber aircraft to perform this role. The Hrabri-class submarines were one of the first new acquisitions aimed at developing a naval force capable of meeting this challenge.

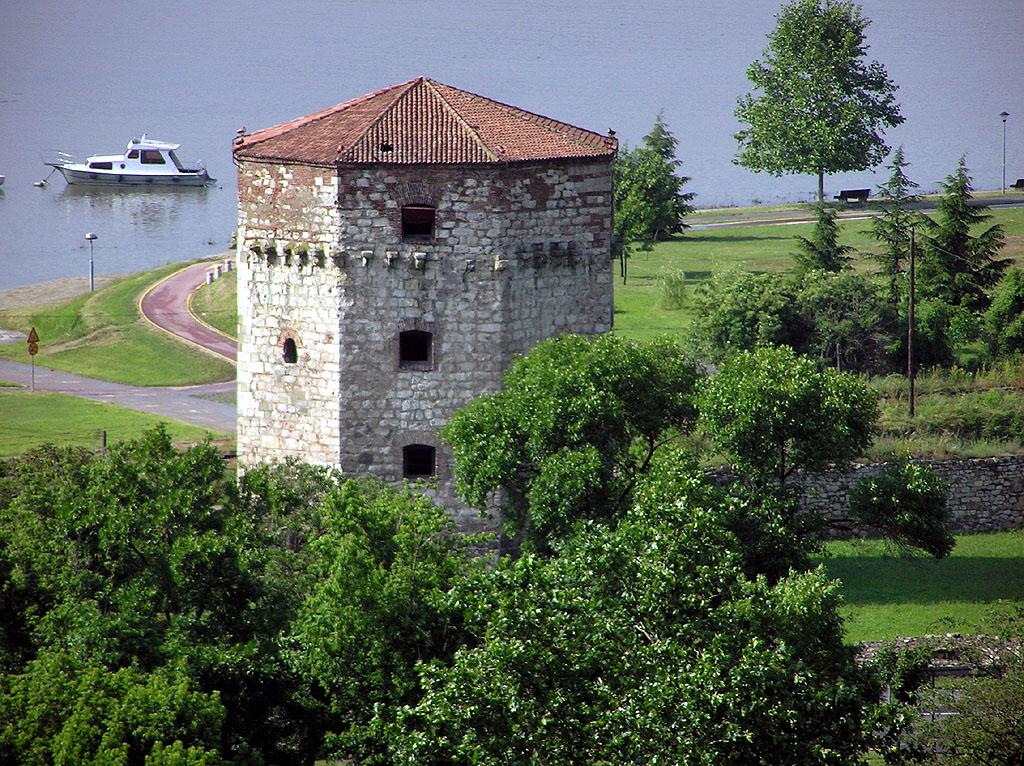
Nebojša was named after the eponymous medieval tower near Belgrade

Nebojša (Fearless) was built for the Kingdom of Serbs, Croats and Slovenes by the Vickers-Armstrong Naval Yard, on the River Tyne, in the United Kingdom. Her design was based on the British L-class submarine of World War I, and she was built using parts originally assembled for HMS L68, which was not completed due to the end of World War I. The British Royal Navy (RN) cancelled the order for L68 in March 1919, and the partially constructed hull was launched on 2 July to free up the slipways on which it was being built. In November the hull was sold by the RN to the shipyard, and once the contract with the Yugoslavs was signed she was brought back onto the slipway and completed to a modified design. The British boats were chosen for two reasons: a visit to the Kingdom of Serbs, Croats and Slovenes by HMS L53 in 1926, and a British credit for naval purchases which included spending some of the funds in British shipyards.

The L-class boats were an improved version of the British E class and achieved a better relationship between displacement, propulsion, speed and armament than their predecessors, including a powerful armament of both torpedoes and guns. The class was designed for operations in the North Sea in World War I, but due to their considerable range they were deployed around the world during the interwar period by the RN, including in the Mediterranean, and three were still in service at the outbreak of World War II.

== Description and construction ==
=== General ===
Like her sister submarine Hrabri, Nebojša was of a single hull design with a straight stem, circular cross section and narrow pointed stern. The ballast and fuel tanks were configured as saddle tanks, one along each side, tapered at either end. The keel was straight until it inclined upwards as part of the pointed stern, and a detachable ballast keel was also fitted. The submarine had two shafts each driving a three-bladed propeller, and boat direction was controlled using a semi-balanced rudder. The forward hydroplanes were positioned about 8 m (26 ft) aft of the bow, and the aft set were positioned aft of the propellers. The two anchors could be lowered from vertical tubes in the bow. The boat had a narrow steel-plated deck, and a tall, long and narrow conning tower with a navigation bridge positioned in the centre of the deck. Both fore and aft and at the same level as the conning tower were gun platforms protected by high bulwarks. The superstructure was partially raised both fore and aft of the gun platforms, with the torpedo hatch and a small torpedo crane forward, and the machinery hatches aft. Aft of the machinery hatches was a small step down which ran to 15 m (49 ft) short of the stern and contained a small ship's boat. The deck was too narrow and slippery for the crew to walk along it while underway.

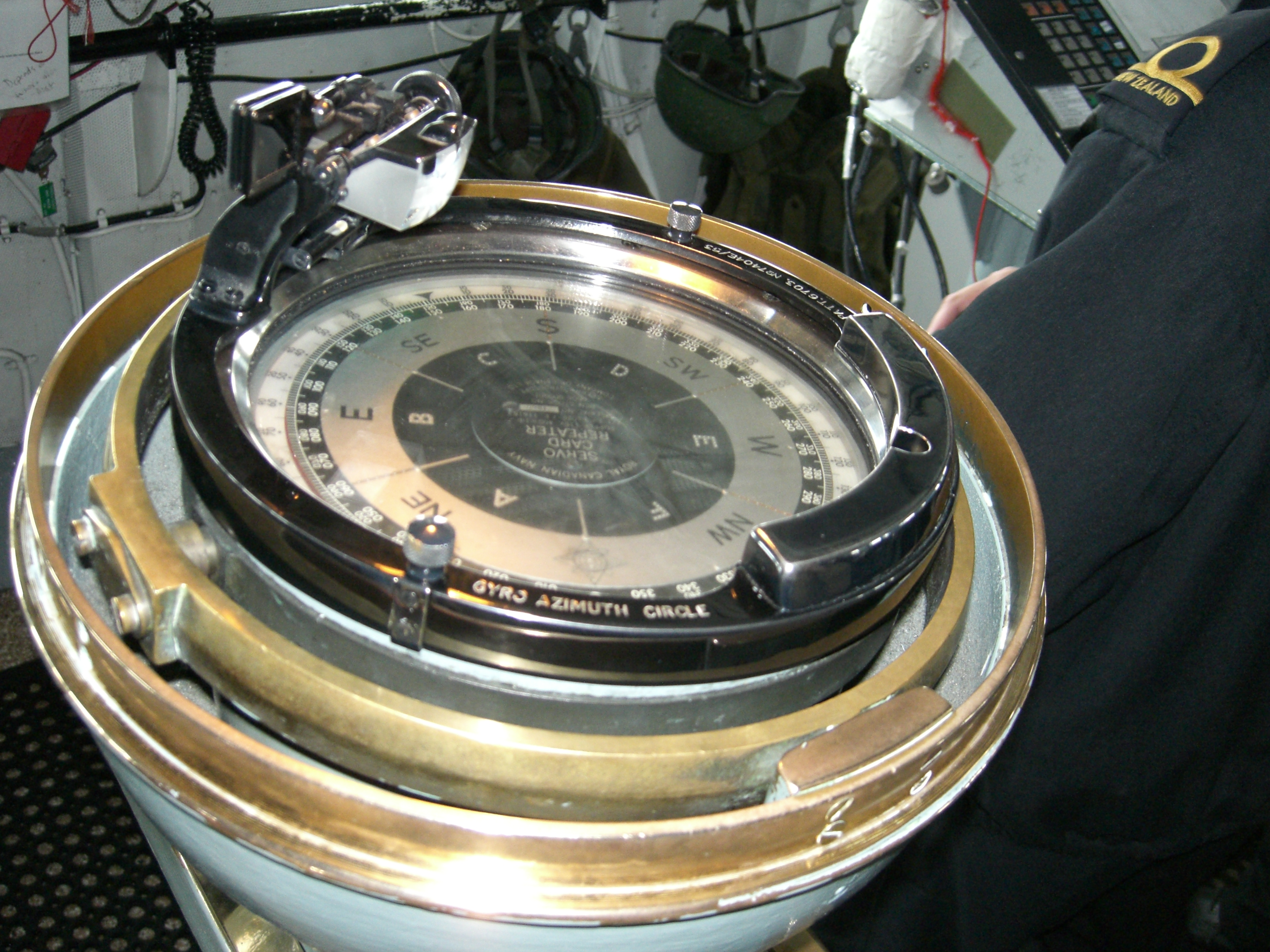
One of the Yugoslav-initiated inclusions on Nebojša was the installation of a gyrocompass salvaged from a former Austro-Hungarian ship.

Internally, transverse bulkheads divided the hull into seven watertight compartments. The first two compartments housed the torpedo tubes and reserve torpedoes, respectively, along with sleeping accommodation for some of the crew. The forward trim tanks were located underneath these two compartments. The upper levels of the third and fourth compartments contained accommodations for the officers and additional crew, respectively, and the lower levels each contained 112-cell electric batteries. In the middle of the boat, underneath the conning tower, was the control room. Aft of that, the fifth compartment was taken up by the machinery room, containing two diesel engines for surface running. Underneath that were diesel fuel tanks. The sixth compartment contained two electric motors on the upper level and an electric battery compartment with another 112 cells on the lower level. At the stern, the seventh compartment contained the steering machinery on the upper level and the aft trim tanks on the lower level.

Several innovations distinguished Nebojša and her sister boat from the original L-class design. At the suggestion of Yugoslav naval officers, gyrocompasses salvaged from former Austro-Hungarian Navy ships were fitted. A central pumping station was also installed, allowing for all ballast tanks to be blown at once from a single position. This enhancement saved the boats from sinking at least twice during their service. The final difference was that one of the three periscopes was modified to enable observation of the skies to warn of impending air attacks.

Nebojša had an overall length of 72.1 metres (236 ft 7 in), a beam of 7.31 m (24 ft), and a surfaced draught of 4 m (13 ft). Her surfaced displacement was 975 long tons (991 t) or 1,164 long tons (1,183 t) submerged. Her crew initially consisted of five officers and 42 enlisted men, but by 1941 this had increased to six officers and 47 enlisted men. She had a diving depth of 50–70 m (160–230 ft), but Yugoslav naval regulations restricted her to a maximum depth of 55 m (180 ft). Nebojša was expected to dive to periscope depth in 70 seconds, but at one point the crew of her sister boat Hrabri achieved this in 52 seconds.

=== Propulsion ===
For surface running, Nebojša was powered by two V12 diesel engines designed by Vickers in 1912 that were rated at a combined 2,400 brake horsepower (1,800 kW) at 380 rpm. Each engine weighed 33.8 t (33.3 long tons; 37.3 short tons), was made up of six parts, each of which held two cylinders. The parts were held together by screws. The screws were subject to great stress during navigation in rough weather, and they often cracked. This was a severe burden on the engine crew, as the work to replace them was exhausting, and forced the navy to stock the boats with a significant number of spare screws, adding significant weight. The naval historian Zvonimir Freivogel states that on a 15-day Mediterranean cruise, Nebojša needed 420 kg (930 lb) of replacement screws.

A total of 76 t (75 long tons; 84 short tons) of fuel was carried, 15 t (15 long tons; 17 short tons) in each of the saddle tanks and the rest inside the hull. As the fuel in the saddle tanks was used it was replaced with sea water to maintain displacement, buoyancy and trim. Nebojša could reach a top speed of 15.7 knots (29.1 km/h; 18.1 mph) on the surface, less than the contract speed of 17.5 kn (32.4 km/h; 20.1 mph). On the surface using the diesel engines, she had a range of 5,000 nautical miles (9,300 km; 5,800 mi) at 9 knots (17 km/h; 10 mph).

When submerged, the two propeller shafts were driven by two electric motors generating a total of 1,600 shaft horsepower (1,200 kW) at 300 rpm. Nebojša also had a small 20 bhp (15 kW) electric motor for silent underwater running. The battery storage consisted of three hundred and thirty-six 3820 LS Exide cells, which had a combined weight of 138 t (136 long tons; 152 short tons). She could reach 10 kn (18.5 km/h; 11.5 mph) on her electric motors when submerged, again less than the contract speed of 10.5 knots (19.4 km/h; 12.1 mph). With the silent running motor, she could achieve a nominal speed of 1.7 to 1.8 kn (3.1 to 3.3 km/h; 2.0 to 2.1 mph) underwater. Underwater, Nebojša had a range of 200 nmi (370 km; 230 mi) at 2 kn (3.7 km/h; 2.3 mph).

=== Armament ===
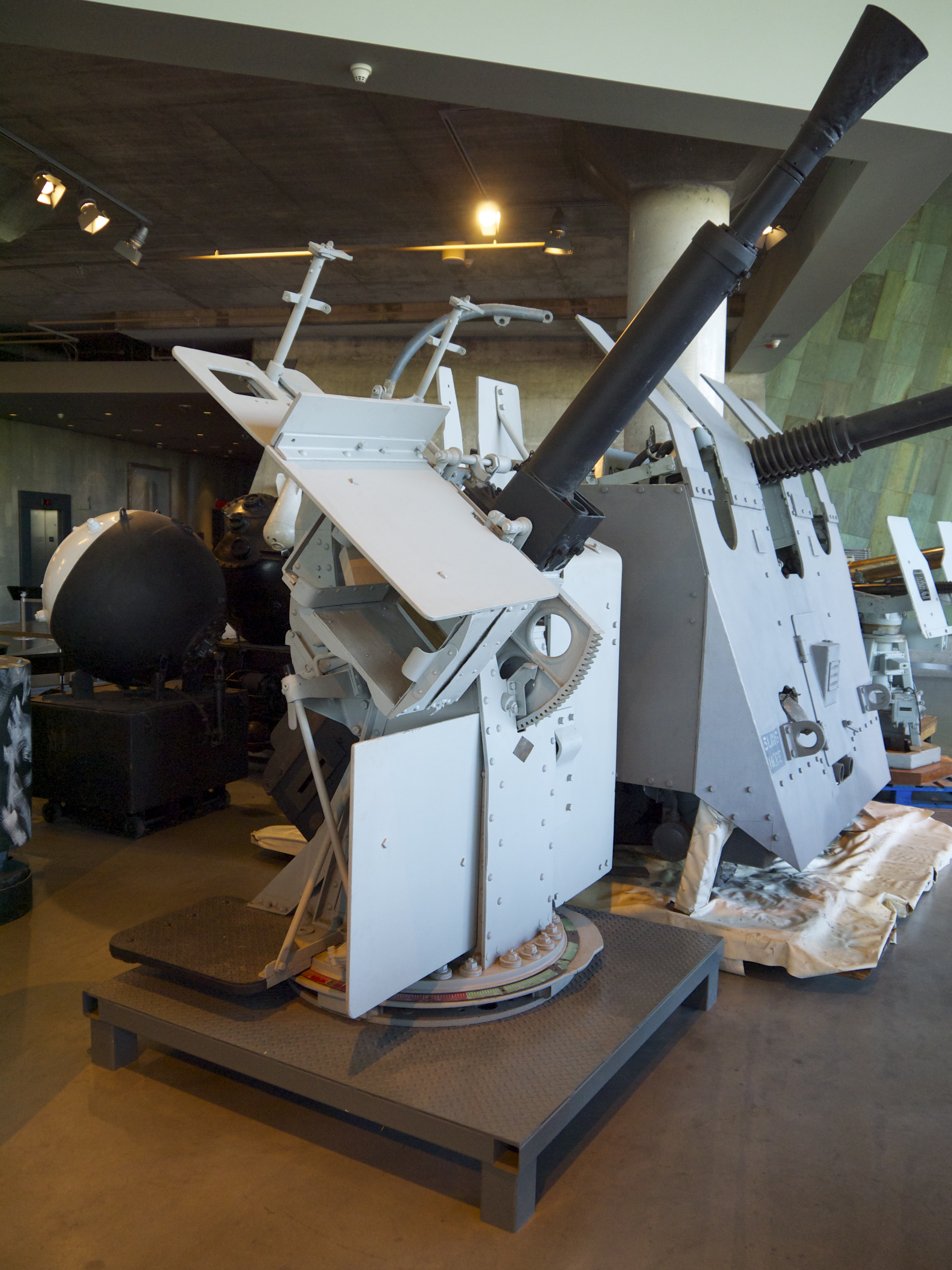
Nebojša was equipped with a single Vickers QF 2-pounder (40 mm (1.6 in)) L/39 gun as her principal anti-aircraft weapon

Nebojša was fitted with six bow-mounted 533 mm (21 in) torpedo tubes and carried twelve Whitehead-Weymouth Mark IV torpedoes, six in the tubes and six reloads. She was also equipped with two 102 mm (4 in) Mark IV L/40 guns, one in each of the mounts forward and aft of the bridge. Each gun weighed 1,200 kg (2,600 lb). Due to the raised gun platforms and protective bulwarks, the guns could be brought into action before the submarine reached full buoyancy and the crews could work them in heavy seas without the danger of being washed overboard. The guns could fire a 14 kg (31 lb) shell up to twelve times a minute to a maximum range of 9,560 m (31,360 ft). Until the destroyer leader Dubrovnik was commissioned in 1932, the Hrabri-class boats had the heaviest armament of any Royal Yugoslav Navy vessel.

=== Modifications in Yugoslav service ===
On arrival in the Adriatic, Nebojša was fitted with a single Vickers QF 2-pounder (40 mm (1.6 in)) L/39 anti-aircraft gun and two anti-aircraft machine guns. The Vickers gun fired a 0.76 kg (1.7 lb) shell to a maximum horizontal range of 6,000 m (20,000 ft) and a maximum vertical range of 4,000 m (13,000 ft). During service the Exide battery cells were replaced with Tudor SHI-37 battery cells. Between 1933 and 1934 Nebojša's superstructure underwent a significant rebuild. The conning tower was reduced in size, the corners were rounded and a bulwark was installed that enclosed the forward part of the towers. At the same time the main gun mounts were lowered and the 2-pounder was removed and replaced with a 13.2 mm (0.52 in) Hotchkiss M1929 anti-aircraft machine gun, which had a maximum horizontal range of 4,000 m (13,000 ft) and a maximum vertical range of 3,000 m (9,800 ft). From this point, Nebojša's silhouette was similar to the British R-class submarine.

== Service history ==
Nebojša was launched on 16 June 1927 with the tactical number 2, which was painted centrally on each side of the conning tower. Nebojša was completed first. During her sea trials Nebojša suffered several mishaps and difficulties. In an incident between mid-September and mid-December 1927, she began to sink quickly at the bow. Her crew reacted quickly and blew all ballast tanks, thereby avoiding the bow striking the seafloor. Many of Nebojša's external details were modified by Vickers in an attempt to achieve the contract speeds. These modifications included closing and remodelling of hull openings and flood slits and using thinner hydroplanes. These changes were to no avail, and by way of compensation Vickers installed a battery charger in the submarine tender Hvar at their own expense. The trial and training phase was extensive, and once it was completed, Nebojša and Hrabri sailed to Portland where they took onboard their complement of torpedoes, before returning to Newcastle.

=== Interwar period ===
The two boats left the Tyne on 11 March 1928 in company with Hvar. En route one of the submarines suffered from engine trouble and the group had a five-day stopover at Gibraltar for repairs. They then had a five-day visit to Algiers in French Algeria and a brief stop at Malta before arriving at Tivat in the Bay of Kotor on the southern Adriatic coast on 5 April. Torpedo exercises for the two boats followed, and then a cruise along the Adriatic coast. In May and June 1929, Nebojša, Hrabri, Hvar and six 250t class torpedo boats accompanied the light cruiser Dalmacija on a cruise to Malta, the Greek island of Corfu in the Ionian Sea, and Bizerte in the French protectorate of Tunisia. According to the British naval attaché, the ships and crews made a very good impression while visiting Malta. On 9 December 1929, the two Osvetnik-class submarines joined the KM, completing the submarine flotilla. In early June 1930, Nebojša was exercising her crew at periscope depth "targeting" the Sitnica between Dubrovnik and the Bay of Kotor when she collided with the 2,324-gross register ton (GRT) Yugoslav steamship Pracat. Nebojša's forward gun was lost and her conning tower was damaged, but neither her saddle tanks or hull were breached, so she was able to safely surface. There were no injuries to the crew members of either vessel. After immediate repairs her forward gun was replaced by a wooden replica, and later the aft gun was moved forward and the aft gun mount was left empty. She was not fully re-armed until the 1933–1934 refit.

In mid-1930, Nebojša, Hrabri and Sitnica cruised the Mediterranean, visiting Alexandria in Egypt and Beirut in Lebanon. Over the next several years, the submarines engaged in a cycle of summer cruises followed by repairs and refits in the winter months. In 1932, the British naval attaché reported that Yugoslav ships engaged in few exercises, manoeuvres or gunnery training due to reduced budgets. In 1933, the attaché reported that the naval policy of Yugoslavia was strictly defensive, aimed at protecting her more than 600 km (370 mi) of coastline. In September 1933, Nebojša and the submarine Osvetnik cruised the southern part of the central Mediterranean. In August 1936, Nebojša and Osvetnik visited the Greek island of Corfu.

By 1938, the KM had determined that the Hrabri-class boats were worn out and obsolete and needed replacement. In October two German Type IIB coastal submarines were ordered to replace them. The outbreak of World War II less than a year later meant that the ordered boats were never delivered and the Hrabri class had to continue in service. During the interwar period, Yugoslavia was a divided country dominated by Serb elites who essentially disregarded the rights and needs of the other constituent nations, and most Yugoslavs lacked a sense of having a share in the country's future. The Yugoslav military largely reflected this division, few considering interwar Yugoslavia worth fighting or dying for.

=== World War II ===
When the German-led Axis invasion of Yugoslavia commenced on 6 April 1941, the entire submarine flotilla was docked in the Bay of Kotor. A few days before the invasion, the KM deployed two submarines each night to patrol the coastline, primarily on the surface. They deployed Nebojša and Osvetnik together, and rotated them on each succeeding night with Hrabri and Smeli. On the day of the invasion Italian bombers attacked KM vessels in the Bay of Kotor. Nebojša was forced to conduct an emergency dive to avoid being hit, and she almost rammed the bottom. A few of her crew were wounded by bomb fragments, but the submarine itself was not damaged.

On 9 April, Nebojša and Smeli were sent to the southern Adriatic to attack Italian maritime traffic between Bari in Italy and the Italian protectorate of Albania. Despite the large amount of traffic in the area, Nebojša did not engage any targets. She returned to the Bay of Kotor on 10 or 11 April, where the fleet had begun to break up and some ships' crews were deserting. On 14 April the pending Yugoslav unconditional surrender was announced, and two days later the crew were advised by their commanding officer, Anton Javoršek, that they would be surrendering the following day. Aware that some of the crew wished to escape to the Allies, he tried to dissuade them from doing so. While he was ashore at a conference, his second-in-command, Đorđe Đorđević, contacted a submarine officer he knew who was attached to the defence headquarters of the Bay of Kotor, Đorđe Mitrović, and offered him the command of the submarine if he would lead the crew that wished to escape to Greece. Mitrović readily agreed and took command. Of the six officers and 46 sailors that normally comprised the crew, three officers and 28 sailors chose to escape. Some of this shortfall was made up by eleven sailors from the submarine reserve pool. That evening she sailed to Kumbor, also in the Bay of Kotor, and took onboard three naval officers, one sailor, nine army officers and six civilians.

Nebojša stopped at Argostoli and Souda Bay during her escape from the Bay of Kotor to Alexandria

Nebojša left the Bay of Kotor on 17 April, and sailed submerged until 20:20 when she surfaced to recharge her batteries during the night. Submerging again, she passed through the Strait of Otranto between Italy and Albania on 18 April. The following day her gyrocompass malfunctioned, and her crew were forced to use an unreliable magnetic compass to navigate. To conduct repairs on the gyrocompass, Nebojša stopped at Argostoli on the island of Cephalonia in the Ionian Islands of western Greece on 20 April, and the army and civilian passengers were put ashore. Resupplied, she left Argostoli on 22 April and headed for the Greek island of Crete. A storm on 23 April near the island of Antikythera tore off some deck plating and two doors from the conning tower, but she made it to Souda Bay on the northwest coast of Crete on the following day. One or two days later she resumed her voyage to Egypt accompanied by the British steamship Destro and the Papanikolis, and escorted by the Orjen-class torpedo boats Durmitor and Kajmakčalan. The latter were German-made Yugoslav vessels that had also escaped at the time of the surrender. At 02:45 on 26 April, the group of vessels was met by a British warship and escorted towards Alexandria. At 12:20 on 27 April, Nebojša's diesel engines broke down and she completed the voyage to Alexandria on her electric motors alone, arriving at 14:20 the same day. Along with other vessels and crews that had escaped during the invasion, Nebojša formed part of the KM-in-exile, which operated out of eastern Mediterranean ports under the operational command of the RN.

In May and June 1941, the British overhauled Nebojša at Alexandria and retrained her crew for operations alongside the RN. During her first test dive, water leaked into the officers' quarters and sent the boat into a 25 degree dive at the bow, but the crew were able to correct the problem and bring her back to port. From 17 June until October, Nebojša operated as a submerged target for anti-submarine warfare training, first for the crews of British destroyers and then the fast minelayers Abdiel and Latona. Between 9 and 28 October, Nebojša participated in reconnaissance and landing exercises for Royal Marine commandos. In November, having had several breakdowns since arriving in Egypt, and given her age, Nebojša was prohibited from diving. Her diesel engines were overhauled, and after she had undergone further repairs she was employed as a charging station for other submarines. The Yugoslav submariners asked the British authorities for a replacement submarine. The British considered the transfer of the HMS Graph, a former German Type VII U-boat, or the transfer of an escort destroyer of the Hunt class as an alternative. These ideas were forestalled by the Cairo mutiny of Yugoslav generals in Egypt, after which almost all of the crew of Nebojša was brought ashore in May 1942 and escorted to a British military camp at Abbassia. All her ammunition and torpedoes were brought ashore, and only one Yugoslav officer and two or three sailors remained aboard Nebojša as part of a mostly British crew. The boat was then sent to Port Said for an extensive overhaul and repairs, including an overhaul of her batteries, and the remaining Yugoslav officer transferred to the British submarine HMS Thrasher.

In January 1943, Nebojša was sent to Beirut for training purposes. Two months later there was an explosion in one of her battery compartments, and she returned to Port Said where 48 of her battery cells were replaced. In April she returned to Alexandria and in May or June she was officially transferred to the KM-in-exile and a Yugoslav crew came aboard. On Nebojša's first sea trial after her transfer both her air compressors failed and the port electric motor burned out. Repairs and overhauling of her engines and motors was undertaken between June and November, and in January 1944 she sailed to Alexandria, before returning to Port Said in October for electric motor repairs. In December Nebojša was ordered to sail to Malta, where the headquarters of the KM-in-exile was located. En route she had to put in to Tobruk in British-administered Libya for repairs to her hydraulic system. She finally arrived in Valletta on 12 January 1945, having been towed and escorted to Malta by British warships.

=== Post-war ===
In August 1945 Nebojša was transferred to the new Yugoslav Navy and renamed Tara with the tactical number P-801. She remained unable to dive and was used as a moored classroom or hulk. She was displayed at the 1952 Navy Day celebrations at Split, by which time her guns and part of her conning tower bulwark had been removed. She was stricken in 1954 and scrapped soon after.

== Legacy ==
In 2011, to mark the 70th anniversary of the invasion of Yugoslavia, the Military Museum in Belgrade, Serbia hosted an exhibit which included a flag from the Nebojša. In April 2013, the 85th anniversary of the arrival of the first Yugoslav submarines at the Bay of Kotor was marked by an event in Tivat, Montenegro, attended by dozens of former Yugoslav submariners.

== See also ==
- List of ships of the Royal Yugoslav Navy
- List of ships of the Yugoslav Navy
