= Yugoslav submarine Smeli =

Yugoslav Osvetnik-class diesel-electric submarine

Smeli
- Smeli's sister submarine Osvetnik underway in 1930

History

Kingdom of Yugoslavia
- Name: Smeli
- Namesake: Daring
- Builder: Ateliers et Chantiers de la Loire, Nantes, France
- Launched: 1 December 1928
- In service: 1928–41
- Out of service: 1941

Italy
- Name: Antonio Bajamonti
- Namesake: Antonio Bajamonti
- Acquired: Captured on 17 April 1941
- In service: 1941–43
- Out of service: 9 September 1943
- Fate: Scuttled by the Italians at La Spezia in Liguria

General characteristics
- Class & type: Osvetnik-class diesel-electric submarine
- Displacement: 630 long tons (640 t) (surfaced); 809 long tons (822 t) (submerged)
- Length: 66.5 m (218 ft 2 in)
- Beam: 5.4 m (17 ft 9 in)
- Draught: 3.8 m (12 ft 6 in)
- Propulsion: 2 × shaft MAN diesel engines 1,480 bhp (1,100 kW), 2 × Nancy electric motors 1,000 shp (750 kW)
- Speed: 14.5 knots (26.9 km/h; 16.7 mph) (surfaced); 9.2 knots (17.0 km/h; 10.6 mph) (submerged)
- Range: 3,500 nautical miles (6,500 km; 4,000 mi) at 9 knots (17 km/h; 10 mph) (surfaced); 75 nmi (139 km; 86 mi) at 5 knots (9.3 km/h; 5.8 mph) (submerged)
- Test depth: 80 m (260 ft)
- Complement: 43
- Armament: 6 × 550 mm (22 in) torpedo tubes (4 × bow, 2 × stern); 1 × 100 mm (3.9 in) gun; 1 × 40 mm (1.6 in) anti-aircraft gun

Smeli (Daring) was the second of the Osvetnik-class diesel-electric submarines built by Ateliers et Chantiers de la Loire, Nantes, France for the navy of the Kingdom of Serbs, Croats and Slovenes (later Yugoslavia). She was launched in 1928, and was built to a partial double hull Simonot design similar to the French Circé-class submarines. She was armed with six 550 mm (22-inch) torpedo tubes, one 100 mm (3.9 in) gun, and one 40 mm (1.6 in) anti-aircraft gun, and could dive to 80 metres (260 ft).

Prior to World War II she participated in several cruises to Mediterranean ports. During the German-led Axis invasion of Yugoslavia in April 1941, she was captured by Italian forces at the Bay of Kotor. Initially designated N2, her armament was changed and her conning tower modified. Due to her age and shallow diving depth, when she was commissioned into the Regia Marina as Antonio Bajamonti; her service was limited to training and experimentation. She was scuttled at La Spezia in Liguria by the Italians in September 1943 the day after the Italian surrender.

== Description and construction ==
Yugoslav naval policy in the interwar period lacked direction until the mid-1920s, although it was generally accepted that the Adriatic coastline was effectively a sea frontier that the naval arm was responsible for securing with the limited resources made available to it. In 1926, a modest ten-year construction program was initiated to build up a force of submarines, coastal torpedo boats, torpedo bombers and conventional bomber aircraft to perform this role. The Osvetnik-class submarines were intended to meet part of this challenge.

Smeli was built for the Kingdom of Serbs, Croats and Slovenes (later Yugoslavia) by the Ateliers et Chantiers de la Loire company (ACL) at Nantes, France. Her partial double hull design was based on plans by ACL's chief engineer, G. Simonot, and was similar to the French Circé-class submarines. Her Serbo-Croatian name translates as "Daring". Along with her sister submarine of the class, Osvetnik, she had an overall length of 66.5 m (218 ft 2 in), a beam of 5.4 m (17 ft 9 in), and a surfaced draught of 3.8 m (12 ft 6 in). Her surfaced displacement was 630 long tons (640 t) or 809 long tons (822 t) submerged, and her crew consisted of 43 officers and enlisted men. She had an operational depth of 80 metres (260 ft).

For surface running, the Osvetnik-class boats were powered by two MAN (Maschinenfabrik) diesel engines which were rated at 1,480 brake horsepower (1,100 kW) that drove two propeller shafts. When submerged, the propellers were driven by two Nancy electric motors generating 1,000 shaft horsepower (750 kW). They could reach a top speed of 14.5 knots (26.9 km/h) on the surface, and 9.2 knots (17.0 km/h) on their electric motors when submerged. They were armed with six 550 mm (22 in) torpedo tubes (four bow-mounted, two stern-mounted), one 100 mm (3.9 in) gun, and one 40 mm (1.6 in) anti-aircraft gun. On the surface, the boats had a range of 3,500 nautical miles (6,500 km) at 9 knots (17 km/h), and 75 nautical miles (139 km) at 5 knots (9.3 km/h) submerged.

== Service history ==
Smeli was the second of her class, and the fourth submarine of the navy of the Kingdom of Serbs, Croats and Slovenes (later the Royal Yugoslav Navy). She was launched on 1 December 1928. She and Osvetnik arrived in the Bay of Kotor on 9 December 1929. In 1932, the British naval attaché reported that Yugoslav ships were engaging in few exercises, manoeuvres or gunnery training due to reduced budgets. In October 1934, Smeli visited Bizerte in the French protectorate of Tunisia, and the Kelibia Roads off the coast of Tunisia. In August and September 1937, Smeli, along with the British-made submarine Hrabri and the depot ship Zmaj, visited Greece, including the port of Piraeus, and the islands of Crete and Corfu.

When the German-led Axis invasion of Yugoslavia began on 6 April 1941, she was in the Bay of Kotor on the southern Adriatic coast along with the three other submarines of the Submarine Division. On 17 April she was captured by the Italian XVII Corps at the Bay of Kotor. Still in good condition, she was taken as war booty, and initially designated N2. She was refitted and modernised at Pola in the upper Adriatic, which involved the replacement of some of her armament and modifications to her conning tower. Her new displacement was 665 long tons (676 t) (822 long tons (835 t) submerged). She was commissioned by the Italians as the Bajamonti-class Antonio Bajamonti, named after the 19th-century politician and mayor of the Dalmatian port of Split. Despite her stability when submerged and good diving rate, her age and shallow diving depth limited her uses to training and experimentation. She was scuttled by the Italians at La Spezia in Liguria on 9 September 1943, the day after the Italian surrender.

== See also ==
- List of ships of the Royal Yugoslav Navy
