= HMS L53 =

History

United Kingdom
- Name: HMS L53
- Builder: Armstrong Whitworth, Newcastle-Upon-Tyne
- Laid down: 19 June 1917
- Launched: 12 August 1919
- Fate: Sold for scrap, 23 January 1939

General characteristics
- Class & type: L-class submarine
- Displacement: 960 long tons (980 t) surfaced; 1,150 long tons (1,170 t) submerged
- Length: 235 ft (71.6 m)
- Beam: 23 ft 6 in (7.2 m)
- Draught: 13 ft 2 in (4.0 m)
- Installed power: 2,400 bhp (1,800 kW) (diesel); 1,600 hp (1,200 kW) (electric)
- Propulsion: 2 × diesel engines; 2 × electric motors
- Speed: 17 kn (31 km/h; 20 mph) surfaced; 10.5 kn (19.4 km/h; 12.1 mph) submerged
- Range: 4,500 nmi (8,300 km; 5,200 mi) at 8 kn (15 km/h; 9.2 mph) on the surface
- Test depth: 150 feet (45.7 m)
- Complement: 44
- Armament: 6 × bow 21 in (533 mm) torpedo tubes; 2 × 4-inch deck guns

HMS L53 was a late-model L-class submarine built for the Royal Navy during the First World War. The boat was not completed before the end of the war and was sold for scrap in 1939.

== Design and description ==
L52 and its successors were modified to maximise the number of 21-inch (53.3 cm) torpedoes carried in the bow. The submarine had a length of 235 feet (71.6 m) overall, a beam of 23 feet 6 inches (7.2 m) and a mean draught of 13 feet 2 inches (4.0 m). They displaced 960 long tons (980 t) on the surface and 1,150 long tons (1,170 t) submerged. The L-class submarines had a crew of 44 officers and ratings. They had a diving depth of 150 feet (45.7 m).

For surface running, the boats were powered by two 12-cylinder Vickers 1,200-brake-horsepower (895 kW) diesel engines, each driving one propeller shaft. When submerged each propeller was driven by a 600-horsepower (447 kW) electric motor. They could reach 17 knots (31 km/h; 20 mph) on the surface and 10.5 knots (19.4 km/h; 12.1 mph) underwater. On the surface, the L class had a range of 4,200 nautical miles (7,800 km; 4,800 mi) at 10 knots (19 km/h; 12 mph).

The boats were armed with six 21-inch torpedo tubes in the bow. They carried eight reload torpedoes for a grand total of a dozen torpedoes. They were also armed with two 4-inch (102 mm) deck guns.

== Construction and career ==
HMS L53 was laid down on 19 June 1917 by Armstrong Whitworth at their Newcastle-Upon-Tyne shipyard and launched on 12 August 1919. She was then towed to HM Dockyard, Chatham for completion on 16 January 1925. HMS L53 was sold for scrap on 23 January 1939.
