= Yugoslav minelayer Zmaj =

Yugoslav and German warship (1928–1944)

- Zmaj as originally built

Class overview
- Name: Zmaj
- Operators: Royal Yugoslav Navy; Kriegsmarine
- Built: 1928–1930
- In commission: 1931–1944
- Completed: 1
- Lost: 1

History

Kingdom of Yugoslavia
- Name: Zmaj
- Namesake: Dragon
- Builder: Deutsche Werft, Hamburg, Germany
- Laid down: 1928
- Launched: 22 June 1929
- Completed: 20 August 1930
- Commissioned: 1931
- Reclassified: As minelayer, 1937
- Fate: Captured by the Italians on 17 April 1941 and handed over to the Germans soon after

Nazi Germany
- Name: Drache
- Namesake: Dragon
- Acquired: 17 April 1941
- Renamed: Schiff 50, 6 November 1942
- Reclassified: Aircraft rescue ship, 7 August 1941; Troop transport, 27 December 1941; Minelayer, August 1942
- Refit: April–August 1942 as minelayer
- Fate: Sunk by aircraft, 22 September 1944, and subsequently scrapped

General characteristics
- Type: Seaplane tender
- Displacement: 1,870 t (1,840 long tons)
- Length: 83 m (272 ft 4 in)
- Beam: 13 m (42 ft 8 in)
- Draft: 4 m (13 ft 1 in)
- Installed power: 3,260 shp (2,430 kW)
- Propulsion: 2 shafts, 2 MAN diesel engines
- Speed: 15 knots (28 km/h; 17 mph)
- Range: 4,000 nmi (7,400 km; 4,600 mi)
- Complement: 145
- Armament: 2 × single 83.5 mm (3.3 in) AA guns; 2 × twin 40 mm (1.6 in) AA guns
- Aircraft carried: 1 × Seaplane
- Aviation facilities: 1 × Handling crane

The Yugoslav minelayer Zmaj was built in Weimar Germany for the Royal Yugoslav Navy in the late 1920s. She was built as a seaplane tender, but does not appear to have been much used in that role and was converted to a minelayer in 1937. Shortly before the Axis invasion of Yugoslavia in April 1941 during the Second World War, she laid minefields along the Dalmatian coast, perhaps inadvertently leading to the sinking of two Yugoslav passenger ships. Slightly damaged by Italian dive bombers and then captured by the Italians during the invasion, she was soon handed over to the Germans. While in their service the ship was renamed Drache, had her anti-aircraft (AA) armament improved, and was used as a seaplane tender and later as a troop transport. In the latter role she participated in over a dozen convoys between the Greek port of Piraeus and the Greek island of Crete between December 1941 and March 1942.

The ship was rebuilt as a minelayer in mid-1942, and her AA armament was further improved. Soon after being recommissioned in August, she was renamed Schiff 50 and was used to evaluate the shipboard use of helicopters for anti-submarine warfare and mine reconnaissance. Between mid-March and May 1943 she was deployed as a convoy escort in the Aegean Sea. During this time she was involved in a gun duel with a surfaced British submarine, in which she was damaged and several of her crew members were killed or wounded. She continued to operate as both a troop transport and minelayer, laying several minefields in the Aegean. One minefield she laid in the Dodecanese in 1943 sank one British submarine and two Allied destroyers, and badly damaged a third destroyer. Her AA armament was further enhanced in 1944 but this did not prevent her from being sunk by British aircraft in September while moored in the port of Vathy on the island of Samos. She was scrapped there after the end of World War II.

== Description ==
=== Background ===
The Royal Yugoslav Navy operated a series of seaplane bases on the Dalmatian coast before World War II. Naval authorities determined that a ship was needed to transport seaplanes between the bases and rescue downed aircraft after operations, as had been necessary during World War I. They decided on the smallest possible ship that would carry supplies and spare parts for ten seaplanes, and the navy placed the order with a German shipyard. According to the naval historian Zvonimir Freivogel, the Yugoslavs chose a German shipbuilder because the Germans may have subsidised part of the cost, and due to differences of opinion between Yugoslav naval aviators and their French and British counterparts regarding the size and role of the new ship. The name chosen for the new ship was Zmaj (Dragon) (Serbo-Croatian Cyrillic: Змај, Serbo-Croatian pronunciation: [zmâj]).

=== General characteristics ===
Zmaj's layout was typical for a ship of her type, with the bridge positioned in the center of the raised forecastle, and the aft deck built low and wide to facilitate aircraft handling. She was 83 meters (272 ft 4 in) long overall. She had a beam of 13 meters (42 ft 8 in) and, at deep load, a draft of 4 meters (13 ft 1 in). She displaced 1,870 metric tons (1,840 long tons) at standard load. Zmaj's two propellers were powered by a pair of eight-cylinder, four-stroke MAN Diesel engines that had a maximum output of 3,260 shaft horsepower (2,430 kW). This was enough to propel her to a speed of 15 knots (28 km/h; 17 mph). She carried a total of 140 tonnes (140 long tons) of fuel which gave her a range of 4,000 nautical miles (7,400 km; 4,600 mi). Zmaj's crew totaled 145 officers and men.

She lacked the traditional funnel as her engine uptakes were taken up through the lattice mainmast amidships, which also served as the crane post. She was fitted with a lattice aircraft handling crane with a capacity of 6,500 kilograms (14,300 lb). Zmaj was provided with six boats: two abreast of the bridge on either side, two abreast of the mainmast, one of which was a motorboat, and two dinghies on the stern. She was a poor seakeeping ship due to a combination of her high silhouette and shallow draft, which made her very susceptible to crosswinds, and made steering difficult.

The ship was fitted with two single 55-caliber 83.5-millimeter (3.3 in) Škoda anti-aircraft (AA) guns, one each mounted on the forecastle and the stern. They had a maximum elevation of +85° and fired a 10 kg (22 lb) shell at a muzzle velocity of 800 m/s (2,625 ft/s). The guns had a rate of fire of 12 rounds per minute and had a maximum ceiling of 11,300 m (37,100 ft). Four 40 mm (1.6 in) 67-caliber Škoda AA guns were mounted between the bridge and the mainmast in a twin-gun mount on each side amidships. They fired a 0.95 kg (2.1 lb) shell at a muzzle velocity of 950 m/s (3,117 ft/s). After her 1937 conversion to a minelayer, Zmaj carried 100 mines.

A single dismantled de Havilland DH.60 Moth floatplane was stored in the aircraft hold between the forward superstructure and the mainmast. Its components would be moved from the hold by the aircraft crane to the after deck where the aircraft could be assembled. Then the aircraft would be swayed over the side where it could be launched. The aircraft was removed from the ship when she was converted into a minelayer.

== Construction and career ==
=== Yugoslav ===
Zmaj was built by Deutsche Werft in Hamburg, Germany. Due to the restrictions of the Versailles Treaty, she had to be built as an unarmed auxiliary. Her keel was laid down in 1928 and she was launched on 22 June 1929. While en route to Yugoslavia the ship had a severe engine room fire on 9 September off Flushing, Netherlands, and was forced to return to Hamburg for repairs. These took almost a year and she was accepted by the Royal Yugoslav Navy on 20 August 1930. Zmaj was finally commissioned in 1931 after she was armed and finished fitting-out in Kotor.

According to the naval historian Zvonimir Freivogel, Zmaj appears to have been little used in her intended role; only her salvage of an upside-down Dornier Wal flying boat in the Bay of Kotor in 1936 has been confirmed. He goes on to suggest that this may be why she was converted to a minelayer the next year. Following her conversion she made port visits to Piraeus and Istanbul, Turkey, accompanied by the destroyer Dubrovnik and the submarines Hrabri and Smeli. Zmaj served as the fleet flagship in 1939 and her crew witnessed the new destroyer Ljubljana run aground and sink in January 1940 at the narrow entrance to Šibenik harbor. Zmaj despatched her boats to help rescue Ljubljana's crew. Soon after this incident, Zmaj was herself damaged while departing Šibenik harbor when the strong northern bora wind blew her onto rocks, and the squadron commander ordered her anchor dropped. One propeller was damaged, and she soon sailed for Tivat in the Bay of Kotor for repairs. Freivogel considers it likely that the incident contributed to the relief of the squadron commander.

Shortly before the Axis invasion of Yugoslavia on 6 April 1941 Zmaj, under the command of Captain Leo Zaccaria, laid defensive minefields along the Dalmatian coast and off main ports. These minefields may have caused the loss of the Yugoslav passenger ships Karadjordje and Prestolonasledik Petar off Zlarin. Zmaj was at Šibenik when the invasion began, and was attacked there by Italian Junkers Ju 87B "Picchiatello" dive bombers, but was only slightly damaged. She sailed to Split in an attempt to join the nascent navy of the Axis-aligned Independent State of Croatia, a puppet state that had been established on 10 April, but was captured at Split by the Italians on 17 April and handed over to the Germans soon after.

=== German ===
Renamed Drache (Dragon) by the German Kriegsmarine (navy), she was initially used in support of Luftwaffe seaplane units, but was redesignated as an aircraft rescue ship (German: Flugzeugbergungsschiff) on 7 August 1941. Her armament was increased by two 2-centimeter (0.8 in) and one 1.5-centimeter (0.6 in) anti-aircraft guns as well as racks for a dozen depth charges. Between September and December 1941, Zmaj was damaged by sabotage while undergoing work at the dockyard in Split. She was transferred to the Aegean Sea on 27 December and reclassified as a troop transport. During the period from December 1941 to late March 1942, she was utilised as an escort for 13 convoys between Piraeus and Crete without incident. Drache was modified at Trieste between April and August 1942 for service as a minelayer. Her existing armament was replaced by two 10.5-centimeter (4.1 in), five 3.7-centimeter (1.5 in) and six 2 cm AA guns. It is likely that ammunition for her original 83.5 mm guns was scarce, and that the rearmament was intended to make ammunition resupply easier. She was equipped with four mine rails on her after deck that could accommodate up to 120 mines and another 120 mines could be carried internally. Her crane was replaced by two derricks and the lattice mainmast was plated over and resembled a funnel. A 20-by-5-meter (65 ft 7 in × 16 ft 5 in) platform was built behind the funnel above the main deck.

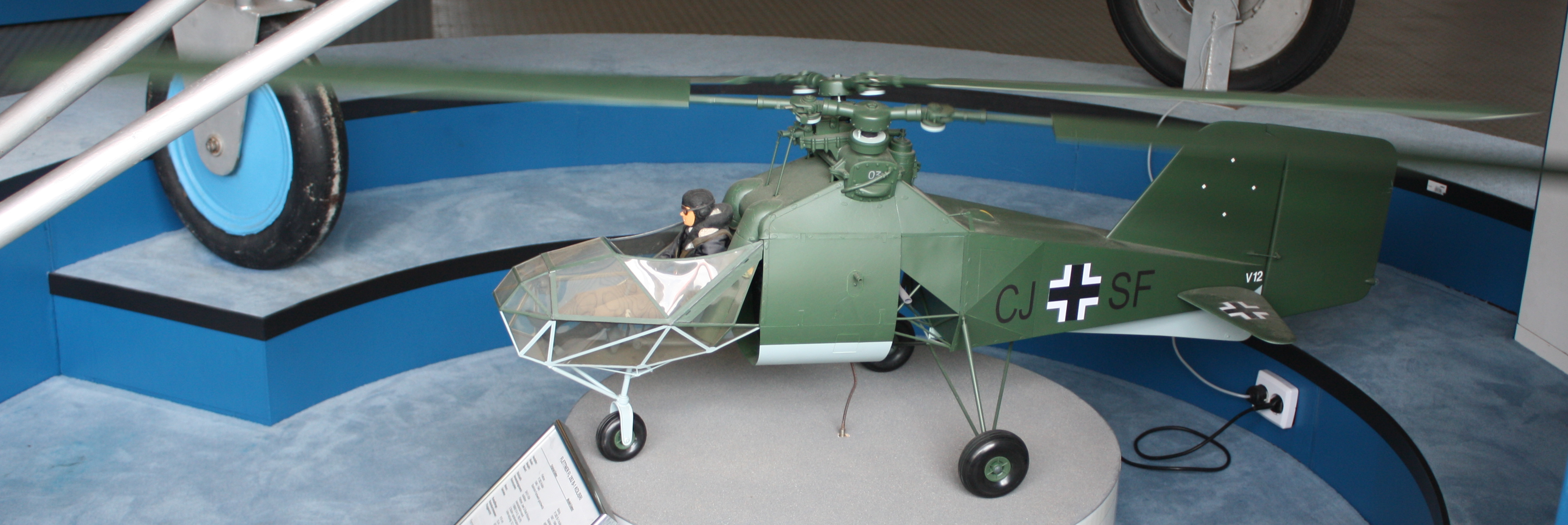
A model of the Fl 282 at the Hubschraubermuseum Bückeburg

Drache was recommissioned on 20 August 1942 under Korvettenkapitän Joachim Wünning, and on 6 November was renamed Schiff 50, serving as a troop transport, escort vessel and submarine chaser in addition to her minelaying duties. Initially the ship was also used for shipboard trials with the Flettner Fl 282 Kolibri (Hummingbird) helicopter. She embarked the V6 and V10 prototypes from November until January–February 1943. They used the small platform abaft the funnel to take-off and land. The Kriegsmarine wished to evaluate their potential for anti-submarine warfare and mine reconnaissance, but visual detection of submarines and mines proved to be possible only in clear weather. On 3 January, she and the Bulgaria were attacked by Allied aircraft in the Aegean Sea, but avoided damage. Between 16 March and May, Schiff 50 escorted convoys travelling between Greece, Crete and the Dardanelles. On the last of these missions, she was escorting the Romanian steamer Alba Iulia from the Dardanelles to Piraeus when they were attacked by the British submarine HMS Parthian. Parthian's torpedoes missed, but in the surface fight that followed Schiff 50 was damaged by Parthian's deck gun, and several of the crew were killed or wounded. Parthian dived and escaped when the Italian destroyer Castelfidardo approached.

Schiff 50 conducted minelaying operations in the Aegean, including off the Dardanelles, off Piraeus, and in the Bay of Salonika, generally operating in company with Bulgaria. She also participated in minelaying off the west coast of Greece alongside the Italian minelayers Francesco Morosini and Barletta. After the surrender of Italy in September 1943, she was used to carry troops to capture the Greek island of Kos from a combined British and Italian force on 2–3 October in Operation Eisbär. Schiff 50 then completed another minelaying mission in the Aegean. The ship was attacked by four British Royal Air Force Bristol Beaufighters off the island of Syros in the Cyclades on 26 September, but incurred only slight damage from their guns. On 8 October she was unsuccessfully attacked by the British submarine HMS Unruly although her companion, Bulgaria, was sunk. Schiff 50's most successful operation was a minefield laid just east of the islands of Pserimos and Kalymnos in the Dodecanese to protect German troops during the capture of the Greek island of Leros from another combined British and Italian force. First the British submarine HMS Trooper sank in this minefield on 15 October. Then the British destroyer HMS Hurworth and the Greek destroyer Adrias, carrying supplies and reinforcements for the British forces on Leros, ran into this minefield on the evening of 22 October. Adrias had her bow blown off and Hurworth sank after having been blown in half. Despite severe damage, Adrias was eventually able to make it back to Alexandria in Egypt. Two nights later the destroyer HMS Eclipse encountered the same minefield while carrying reinforcements to Leros. She struck a mine, broke in two, and sank in three minutes.

Between 12 and 22 December 1943, Schiff 50 participated in two convoys that ferried German troops from Piraeus to the Greek island of Samos, and returned with Italian prisoners of war. These convoys were escorted by the captured Italian destroyers Turbine and Francesco Crispi (designated Torpedoboot Ausland (foreign torpedo boat)), and renamed TA 14 and TA15 respectively. The latter convoy was attacked twice by an unknown submarine, which was chased off by TA15. Schiff 50 participated in a further troop transport convoy from Piraeus to the island of Milos in the Cyclades on 11 and 12 January 1944, during which she and her escort, the captured Italian destroyer San Martino, now TA17, mistakenly fired on German aircraft. This was followed by two minelaying missions: on 15 and 16 January off the island of Antimilos, just north of Milos, escorted by TA17; and 23 and 24 January in the passages between the islands of Kea, Kythnos, Serifos and Sifnos, escorted by TA17 and the captured Castelfidardo, now TA16.

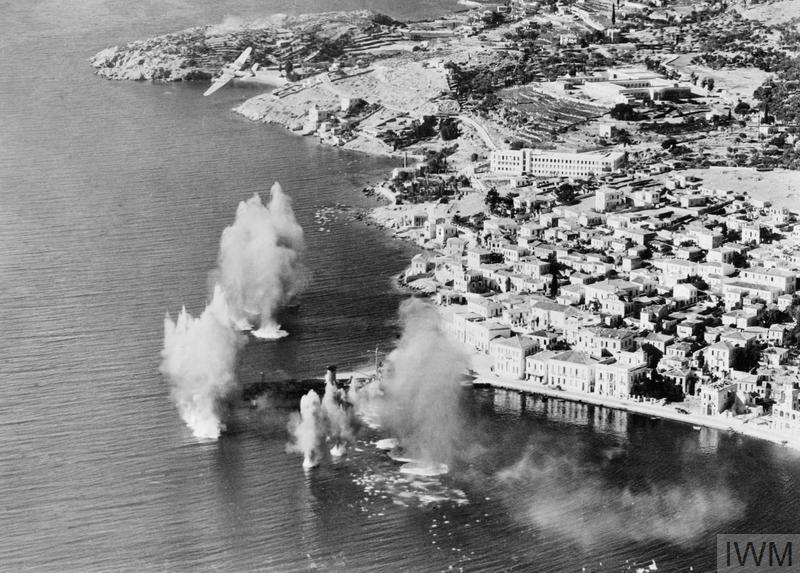
Schiff 50 under attack by Beaufighters on 22 September 1944 in Vathy

Schiff 50's AA armament was augmented during 1944. One quadruple 2 cm Flakvierling 38 mount was installed on each side of the bridge and she carried a total of thirteen 2 cm guns, with the other five in single mounts on the after deck abreast the mine rails. Her 10.5 cm guns were exchanged for lighter 8.8-centimeter (3.5 in) guns to compensate for the increased top weight. On 8 and 9 May 1944, Schiff 50 laid a defensive minefield near Piraeus, escorted by TA17 and the captured Italian destroyer Calatafimi, now TA19, during which they were attacked with rockets by Allied aircraft, but their powerful AA armament drove off their attackers. Schiff 50's guns were insufficient to save her when she was attacked by several Bristol Beaufighters of No. 252 Squadron RAF while anchored in Vathy harbor on Samos on the afternoon of 22 September 1944. She was set on fire, exploded and sank two hours later; eleven of her crew, including Wünning, died during the attack. She was scrapped at Vathy after the end of the war.
