= SMS Niobe =

German, Yugoslav, and Italian light cruiser (1900–1943)

Coordinates: 44°20′49″N 14°43′12″E

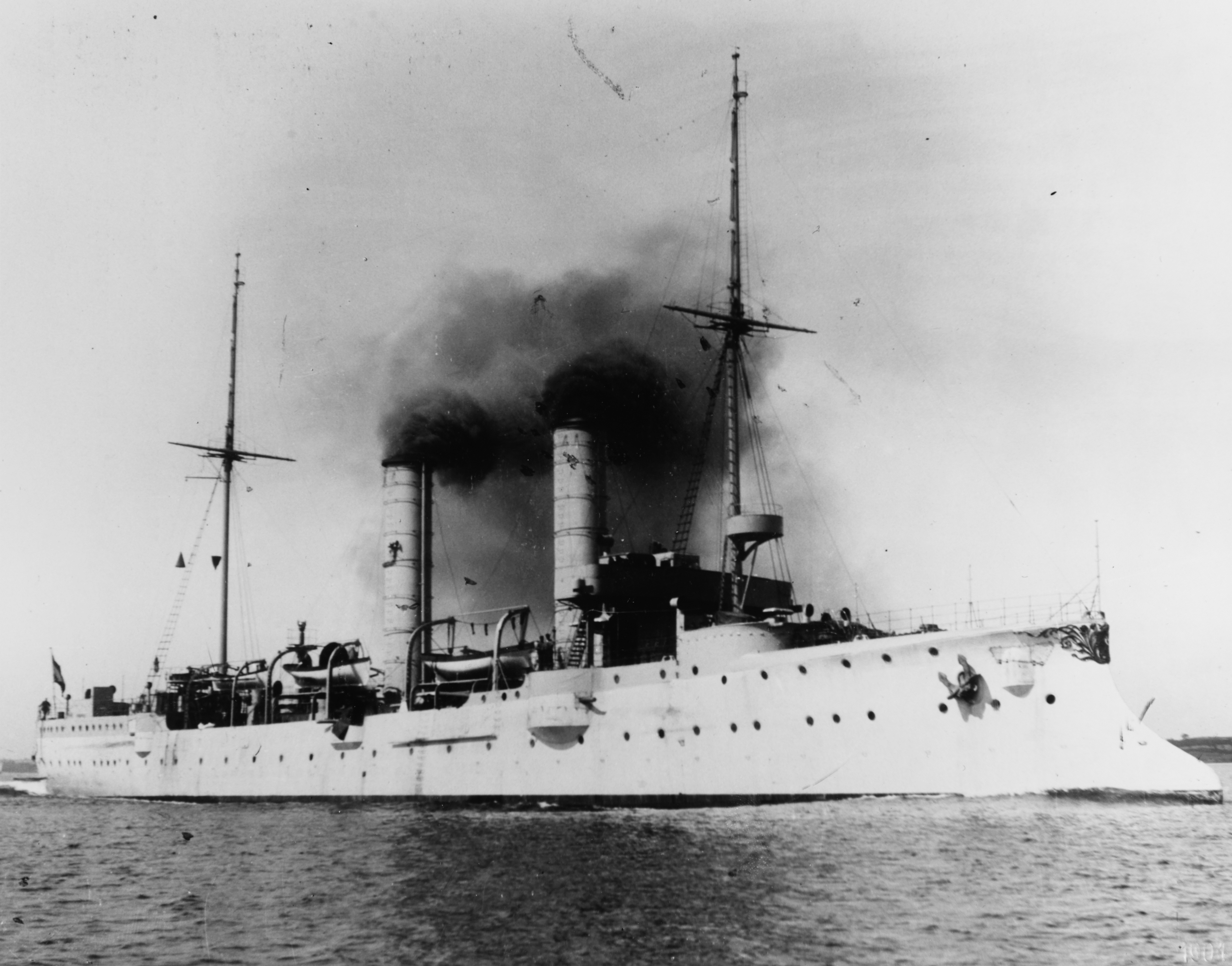
- SMS Niobe in Kiel in 1901

History

Germany
- Name: Niobe
- Builder: AG Weser
- Laid down: 30 August 1898
- Launched: 18 July 1899
- Commissioned: 25 June 1900
- Out of service: Sold to Yugoslavia

Yugoslavia
- Name: Dalmacija
- Acquired: 26 June 1925
- Captured: 25 April 1941

Italy
- Name: Cattaro
- Acquired: 25 April 1941
- Captured: 11 September 1943

Germany
- Name: Niobe
- Acquired: 11 September 1943
- Fate: Beached on Silba and destroyed by British motor torpedo boats in December 1943

General characteristics
- Class & type: Gazelle-class cruiser
- Displacement: Normal: 2,643 t (2,601 long tons); Full load: 2,963 t (2,916 long tons)
- Length: 105 m (344 ft 6 in) loa
- Beam: 12.2 m (40 ft)
- Draft: 5.03 m (16 ft 6 in)
- Installed power: 8 × Thornycroft boilers; 8,000 PS (7,900 ihp)
- Propulsion: 2 × triple-expansion steam engines; 2 × screw propellers
- Speed: 21.5 kn (39.8 km/h; 24.7 mph)
- Range: 3,570 nmi (6,610 km; 4,110 mi) at 10 kn (19 km/h; 12 mph)
- Complement: 14 officers; 243 enlisted men
- Armament: 10 × 10.5 cm (4.1 in) SK L/40 guns; 2 × 45 cm (17.7 in) torpedo tubes
- Armor: Deck: 20 to 25 mm (0.79 to 0.98 in); Conning tower: 80 mm (3.1 in); Gun shields: 50 mm (2 in)

SMS Niobe (Note: "SMS" stands for "Seiner Majestät Schiff" (German: His Majesty's Ship).) was the second of ten Gazelle-class light cruisers that were built for the German Kaiserliche Marine ('Imperial Navy') in the late 1890s and early 1900s. The Gazelle class was the culmination of earlier unprotected cruiser and aviso designs, combining the best aspects of both types in what became the progenitor of all future light cruisers of the Imperial fleet. Built to serve with the main German fleet and also in German colonies, she was armed with a battery of ten 10.5 cm (4.1 in) guns and had a top speed of 21.5 knots (39.8 km/h; 24.7 mph). The ship had a long career, serving in the German, Yugoslav, and Italian fleets over the span of more than forty years.

Niobe served in both home and overseas waters in the Imperial Navy, serving in a variety of roles, including as a flotilla leader for torpedo boats, as a scout for the main fleet, and as a station ship with the East Asia Squadron. After the outbreak of World War I, the ship joined the vessels tasked with defending Germany's North Sea coast. By late 1915, she was withdrawn from active service and used as a headquarters ship for various commands. She was disarmed in 1917, but as one of the cruisers permitted to the postwar Reichsmarine (Navy of the Realm) by the Treaty of Versailles, she was modernized and rearmed in the early 1920s.

The ship saw no active service with the Reichsmarine and, in 1925, Germany sold the ship to the Kingdom of Serbs, Croats and Slovenes (later Yugoslavia). There, she was renamed Dalmacija and served in the Royal Yugoslav Navy until April 1941, when she was captured by the Italians during the Axis invasion of Yugoslavia. Renamed Cattaro, she served in the Italian Regia Marina (Royal Navy) until the Italian surrender in September 1943. She was then seized by the German occupiers of Italy, who restored her original name. She was used in the Adriatic Sea briefly until December 1943, when she ran aground on the island of Silba, and was subsequently destroyed by British motor torpedo boats. The wreck was ultimately salvaged and broken up for scrap between 1947 and 1952.

== Design ==
Following the construction of the unprotected cruisers of the Bussard class and the aviso Hela for the German Kaiserliche Marine (Imperial Navy), the Construction Department of the Reichsmarineamt (Imperial Navy Office) prepared a design for a new small cruiser that combined the best attributes of both types of vessels. The designers had to design a small cruiser with armor protection that had an optimal combination of speed, armament, and stability necessary for fleet operations, along with the endurance to operate on foreign stations in the German colonial empire. The resulting Gazelle design provided the basis for all of the light cruisers built by the German fleet to the last official designs prepared in 1914.

Plan, profile, and cross-section of the Gazelle class

After construction of Gazelle had begun, the German Navy secured the passing of the Naval Law of 1898; this act authorized a total cruiser strength of thirty small cruisers. Two were ordered immediately, the second of which became Niobe. Both of these new ships differed in minor details from Gazelle, Niobe being fitted with more powerful Thornycroft boilers, which significantly increased the power of the ship's propulsion system and thus top speed compared to Gazelle.

Niobe was 105 m (344 ft 6 in) long overall, with a beam of 12.2 m (40 ft) and a draft of 5.03 m (16 ft 6 in) forward. She displaced 2,643 t (2,601 long tons) normally and up to 2,963 t (2,916 long tons) at full combat load. The ship had a minimal superstructure, which consisted of a small conning tower and bridge structure. She was fitted with two pole masts. Her hull had a raised forecastle and quarterdeck, along with a pronounced ram bow. She had a crew of 14 officers and 243 enlisted men.

Her propulsion system consisted of two four-cylinder triple-expansion steam engines manufactured by AG Germania in Tegel, driving a pair of screw propellers. The engines were powered by eight coal-fired Thornycroft water-tube boilers that were vented through a pair of funnels. They were designed to give 8,000 metric horsepower (7,900 ihp), for a top speed of 21.5 knots (39.8 km/h; 24.7 mph). Niobe carried 500 t (490 long tons) of coal, which gave her a range of 3,570 nautical miles (6,610 km; 4,110 mi) at 10 knots (19 km/h; 12 mph).

The ship was armed with ten 10.5 cm (4.1 in) SK L/40 guns in single pivot mounts protected by gun shields. Two were placed side by side forward on the forecastle; six were located on the broadside in sponsons; and two were placed side by side aft. The guns could engage targets out to 12,200 m (13,300 yd). They were supplied with 1,000 rounds of ammunition, for 100 shells per gun. She was also equipped with two 45 cm (18 in) torpedo tubes with five torpedoes. They were submerged in the hull on the broadside.

She was protected by an armored deck that was 20 to 25 mm (0.8 to 1.0 in) thick. The deck sloped downward at the sides of the ship to provide a measure of protection against incoming fire. The conning tower had 80 mm (3.1 in) thick sides, and the gun shields were 50 mm (2 in) thick.

== Service history ==
=== Construction and early career ===
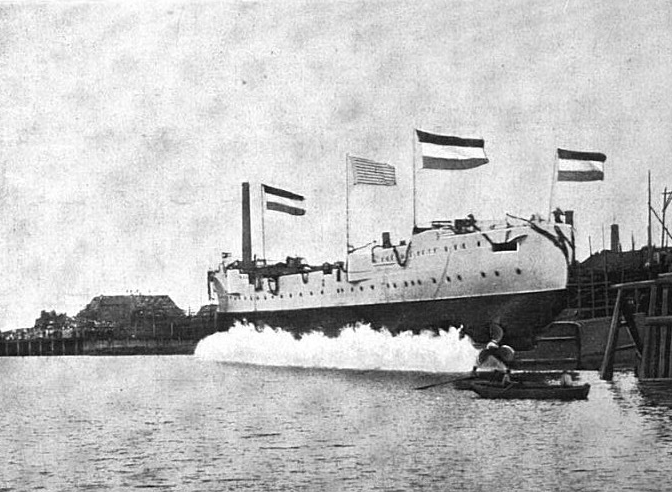
Niobe at her launching

Niobe was ordered under the contract name "B", (Note: German warships were ordered under provisional names. Additions to the fleet were given a single letter; ships intended to replace older or lost vessels were ordered as "Ersatz (name of the ship to be replaced)".) and was laid down at the AG Weser shipyard in Bremen on 30 August 1898 and launched on 18 July 1899, after which fitting-out work commenced. Named after Niobe, a figure from Greek mythology, she was commissioned on 25 June 1900 to begin sea trials, which lasted until 22 August. She was thereafter placed in reserve. On 11 April 1901, the ship returned to service and was assigned as the flagship of I Torpedo-boat Flotilla on the 18th, replacing the elderly aviso Blitz, which was by then worn out. Her first commanding officer was Korvettenkapitän (Corvette Captain) Reinhard Scheer, who went on to command the High Seas Fleet at the Battle of Jutland during World War I. Niobe served as flagship until 26 June, and during this period, took part in training exercises in the Baltic Sea and the Kattegat. On 28 June, she left I Flotilla and escorted the imperial yacht Hohenzollern on a trip to Norway. The visit was cut short following the death of Kaiser Wilhelm II's mother, Victoria. Niobe then joined I Squadron for the annual fleet exercises in late August and early September. At the conclusion of the maneuvers, the Germans held a naval review for the visit of Tsar Nicholas II of Russia; Niobe was again tasked with escorting Wilhelm II in Hohenzollern while he met with Nicholas from 11 to 13 September. Niobe then returned to Wilhelmshaven, where she went into drydock for alterations that lasted from 1 October to 1 April 1902.

After Niobe returned to active service in April 1902, she resumed operations with I Torpedo-boat Flotilla, and was stationed in the Baltic. On 2 July, she was transferred back to I Squadron for the annual training exercises and a winter cruise toward the end of the year. During this period, Korvettenkapitän (Corvette Captain) Franz von Hipper served as the ship's commander. In early 1903, she again returned to the I Torpedo-boat Flotilla, her last stint as the flotilla flagship. The Navy initially planned on sending Niobe to reinforce the squadron participating in the naval blockade of Venezuela of 1902–1903, but the incident concluded before she could be sent. Instead, on 1 March, she joined the cruisers of I Scouting Group for her second trip to Norway. She remained in I Scouting Group for the annual maneuvers that followed later in the year, and through 1904 as well. Following the fleet maneuvers in August and September 1904, Niobe was decommissioned on 29 September. She spent the following two years out of service, during which time she underwent a major overhaul.

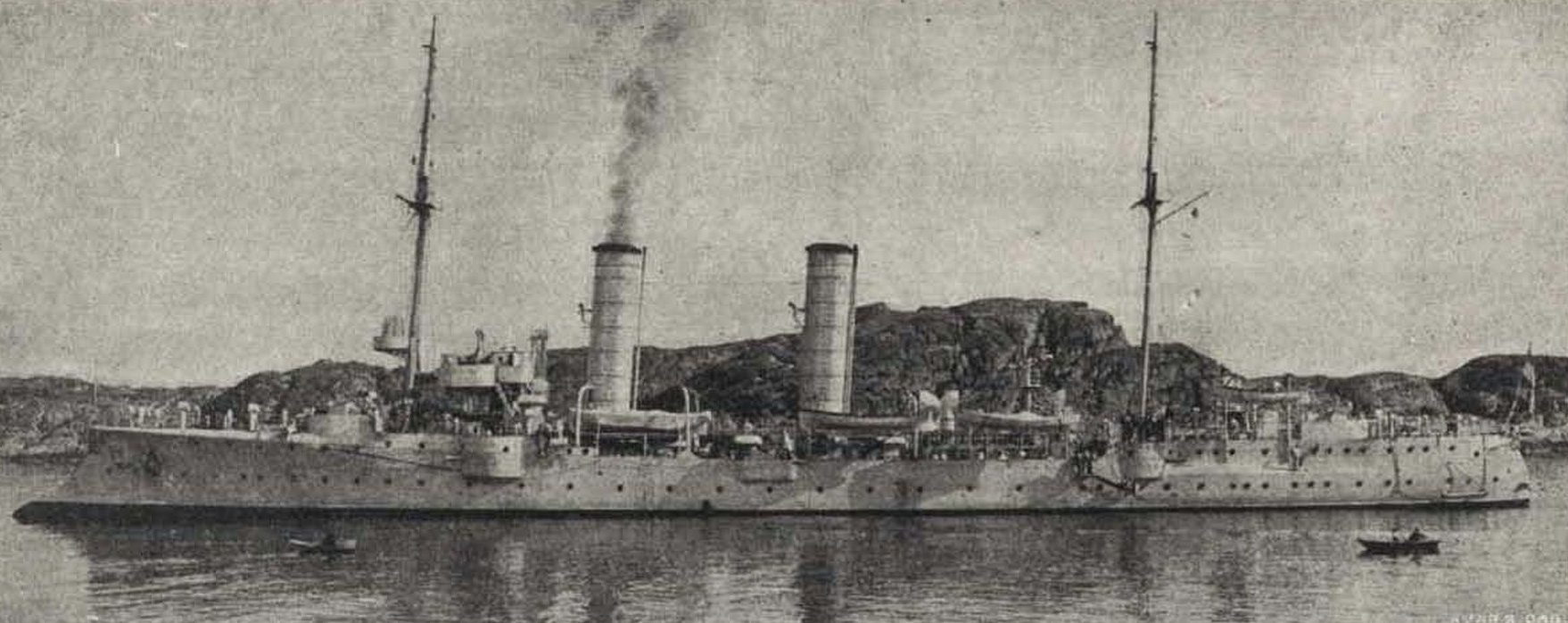
Niobe during a naval visit to Sweden in 1901

On 19 June 1906, Niobe was recommissioned for an overseas deployment as part of the East Asia Squadron. She left Wilhelmshaven on 9 July and rendezvoused with the squadron, the flagship of which was the armored cruiser Fürst Bismarck, on 8 September. The ship cruised Chinese and Japanese waters for the next three years; her time in the East Asia Squadron was uneventful. On 31 January 1909, Niobe steamed out of the main German port in the region, Qingdao, and made the return voyage to Germany. She reached Kiel on 21 March, and having become badly worn out during her three years abroad, she was decommissioned ten days later.

=== World War I ===
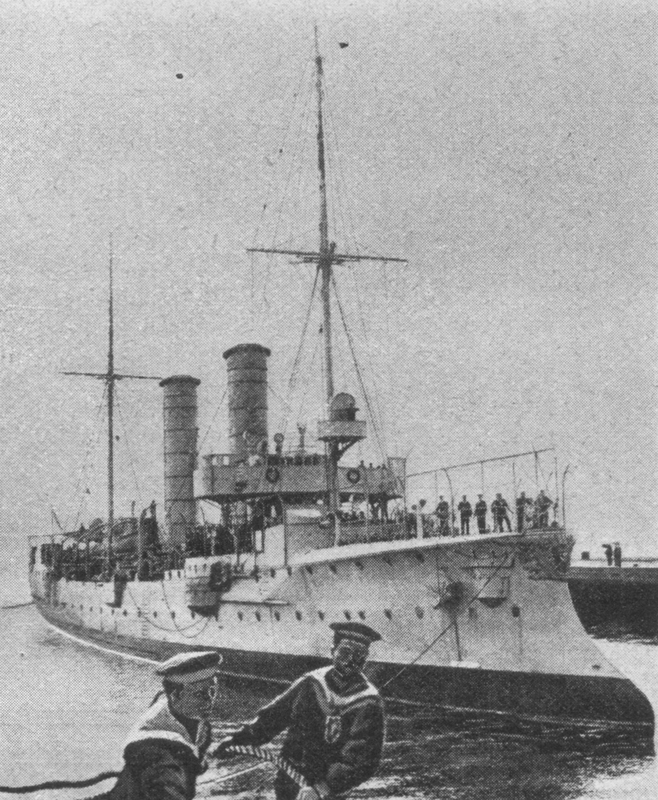
Niobe in port, c. 1902

After the outbreak of World War I in August 1914, Niobe was recommissioned for coastal defense, stationed in the German Bight. Between 28 August to 2 September, and from 23 December, Niobe's commander also served as the commander of the torpedo-boat flotillas defending the Jade Bight and the mouth of the Weser River. She was removed from front-line service on 5 September 1915, and her crew was reduced four days later. The commander of the torpedo-boat flotillas returned to Niobe on 14 January 1916, as his previous flagship, the old coastal defense ship Siegfried, was decommissioned. Niobe nevertheless remained in service with a reduced crew. Kommodore (Commodore) Ludwig von Reuter, the commander of the IV Scouting Group, and his staff briefly used Niobe as a headquarters ship, from 6 June to 3 July. Starting on 20 August, she became the headquarters ship for now-Konteradmiral (Rear Admiral) von Hipper, the commander of the I Scouting Group.

During this period, Hipper organized the office of Befehlshabers der Sicherung der Nordsee (BSN—Commander of the Defense of the North Sea), which was also stationed on Niobe. In 1917, she was disarmed so her guns could be used to reinforce the defenses of Wilhelmshaven. In October that year, Konteradmiral Friedrich Boedicker, then the commander of the I Squadron, came aboard Niobe; the bulk of the High Seas Fleet had gone into the Baltic to launch Operation Albion, and Boedicker temporarily took control of the BSN. Hipper and his staff left Niobe on 11 August 1918, having been promoted to command of the High Seas Fleet. The BSN remained aboard Niobe until January 1919, two months after the war ended with the Armistice; it was then transferred to the old pre-dreadnought battleship Kaiser Wilhelm II, also in use as a headquarters ship. Niobe was then decommissioned on 3 February.

Niobe was among the ships permitted by the Treaty of Versailles after the end of the war, and so she continued on in service with the newly reorganized Reichsmarine. During this period, she was significantly modernized; her old ram bow was replaced with a clipper bow. Her old 10.5 cm SK L/40 guns were replaced with newer SK L/45 guns in U-boat mountings and two 50 cm (20 in) torpedo tubes in deck-mounted launchers were installed. On 24 June 1925, Niobe was stricken from the naval register and sold to the Kingdom of Serbs, Croats and Slovenes (later Yugoslavia).

=== Yugoslav service ===
The Kingdom of Serbs, Croats and Slovenes (KSCS) had initially been given the ships of the old Austro-Hungarian Navy after the dissolution of the Austro-Hungarian Empire in the closing days of World War I, but the Allied powers quickly seized the majority of the ships and allocated them to the various Allied countries. Left with only twelve modern torpedo boats, the new country sought more powerful vessels. It therefore purchased Niobe when Germany placed her for sale in 1925. The copper sheathing of her hull was a significant factor in the purchase, as naval infrastructure in the new state was very limited, and it was not expected that she could be dry docked regularly. Since Germany was forbidden from exporting armed warships, Niobe was taken to the Deutsche Werke shipyard in Kiel and disarmed. She also had her conning tower removed. On 7 August 1926, she began sea trials before being transferred to her new owners. Niobe was taken to the Tivat arsenal in the Bay of Kotor, arriving on 3 September 1927. There, she was rebuilt as a training cruiser, based on a design developed by a KSCS naval commission, with the work supervised by the Dutch Piet van Wienen Company, which had also been responsible for the negotiating the purchase contract. The rebuild included shortening the masts and funnels, a crow's nest was placed atop the foremast, and a radio shack was built in place of the conning tower.

She was renamed Dalmacija (Dalmatia), and also received her new armament before she entered Royal Yugoslav Navy service, though the details are uncertain. According to Conway's All the World's Fighting Ships, she was equipped with six Škoda 8.5 cm (3.35 in) L/55 quick-firing guns, and initially four and later six 2 cm (0.79 in) anti-aircraft (AA) guns were added. The naval historian Henry Lenton states that the main battery caliber was 8.6 cm (3.4 in), states that they were dual-purpose guns, and specifies four 2 cm single-mount AA guns. But naval historian Milan Vego states that she carried six 8.3 cm (3.27 in) L/35 anti-aircraft guns, four 47 mm (1.9 in) guns, and six machine guns. The historian Aidan Dodson concurs with Vego that the ship received six 8.3 cm guns, but instead states that they were 55-caliber guns of the Skoda M27 type. Dodson also agrees that she had four 47 mm guns but states her armament was rounded out by two 15 mm (0.59 in) Zbrojovka ZB-60 anti-aircraft machine-guns. According to the naval historian Zvonimir Freivogel, six Škoda M27 8.35 cm (3.29 in) L/55 anti-aircraft guns were ordered in Czechoslovakia and fitted by the arsenal in Tivat. Freivogel goes on to state that the M27 was an improved model of the M22/24 gun, and was confusingly offered on the international arms market as an 84 mm, 84.5 mm or 85 mm gun. Single guns were mounted forward and aft, with the remaining four guns mounted amidships, two on each side fore and aft of the second funnel. These open sponson mounts were below main deck level and had an outward folding plate that allowed the crew to serve the gun from all sides. With a muzzle velocity of 800 m (2,600 ft) per second, the guns could engage targets out to 18,000 m (20,000 yd) and to a vertical range of 11,000 m (12,000 yd), with a shell weighing 10 kg (22 lb). They were supplied with a total of 1,500 shells, for 250 shells per gun. Freivogel asserts that two of the 47 mm guns were mounted on the forecastle under the bridge wings, with the second pair athwart of the forward 83.5 mm gun. He goes on to state that the two 15 mm machine guns were mounted on the bridge wings. In Yugoslav service, her crew numbered 300.

After entering service, Dalmacija was employed as a gunnery training ship. In May and June 1929, Dalmacija, the submarines Hrabri and Nebojša, the submarine tender Hvar and six torpedo boats went on a cruise to Malta, the Greek island of Corfu in the Ionian Sea, and Bizerte in the French protectorate of Tunisia. According to the British naval attaché, the ships and crews made a very good impression while visiting Malta. In 1930, the ship underwent a minor refit and her foremast was modified, including by the addition of supporting struts that converted it into a tripod mast. In 1931, a new firing director was installed forward. Throughout the 1930s, the ship went on several training cruises in the Mediterranean Sea, and during this period she served as a flagship on a number of occasions. Due to her elegance and age, Yugoslav sailors nicknamed her Teti Jela (Auntie Helen).

==== World War II ====
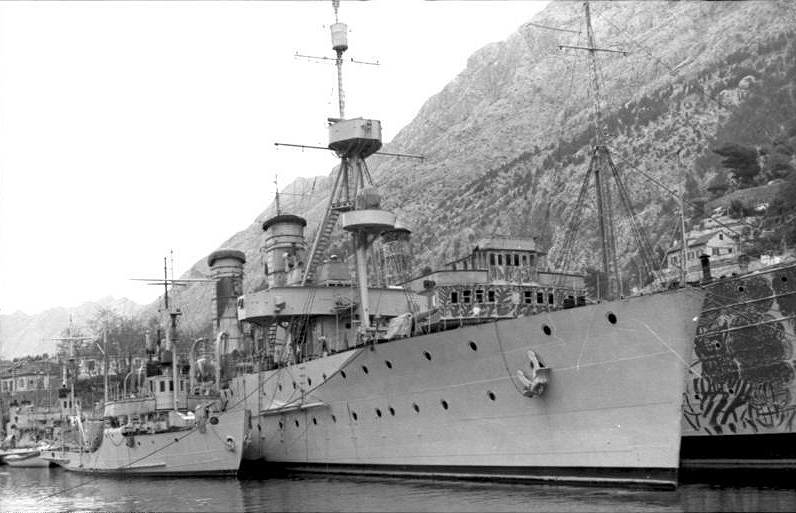
Dalmacija in Kotor after the German invasion in April 1941

In April 1941, during the Axis invasion of Yugoslavia, Dalmacija remained in the Bay of Kotor. Some forty years old by that time, the ship was kept in port as a harbor defense vessel, since her relatively heavy anti-aircraft armament could be used to defend against air attacks. Early on 6 April, the first day of the invasion, Dalmacija steamed to a position within the Bay of Kotor between the towns of Perast and Prčanj and engaged Axis aircraft. Later she defended the destroyers of the 1st Division – Dubrovnik, Beograd and Zagreb – as they were attacked by Axis aircraft flying at low-altitude. In this task her 83.5 mm guns were of limited value. Initially she had the Yugoslav fleet headquarters embarked, but when it was decided to implement the pre-war plan of the fleet attacking the Italian enclave of Zara in Dalmatia, the fleet headquarters was transferred to the admiralty yacht Beli Orao on 9 April so that Dalmacija could provide anti-aircraft support for the operation. Initially the 1st Division was to conduct the operation, but this was soon changed to the 2nd Division, which consisted mainly of motor torpedo boats based at Šibenik. The plan was abandoned on 10 April when the Axis puppet state known as the Independent State of Croatia was declared, accelerating the disintegration of the Yugoslav armed forces. Following the Yugoslav surrender on 17 April, the ship was captured by the Italians in Kotor on 25 April. Renamed Cattaro after the Italian name for Kotor, the ship was placed in service with the Regia Marina as a gunboat and gunnery training ship, based at the artillery school in Pola. Cattaro served as a target ship for the submarine school at Pola and Italian torpedo bombers based at Gorizia. She also took part in the first Italian trials with wireless-guided torpedoes.

On 31 July 1942, the cruiser was attacked by the British submarine HMS Traveller south of the village of Premantura on the Istrian coast, but all of the torpedoes missed. In May 1943, the ship shelled Yugoslav Partisan positions near Karlobag, along with the armed steamship Jadera, and the artillery pontoon GM 240 towed by the tug Ponderoso. Cattaro was supplied with coal directly from a mine at Albona in Istria, and on one occasion an unexploded charge from the mine was inadvertently shovelled into a boiler where it exploded. At the time of the Italian surrender on 8 September 1943, Cattaro was undergoing boiler repairs at Pola. She sailed to the anchor buoy that had been used by the Italian dreadnought battleship Giulio Cesare – which had escaped – and negotiations between the small number of Germans at Pola and the Italians continued until 12 September when her crew surrendered following the arrival in Pola of the German 71st Infantry Division.

The ship's fate is somewhat unclear; according to Hildebrand et al., Cattaro was later transferred to the Navy of the Independent State of Croatia, where she was commissioned as a training ship under the name Znaim. She returned to German service in September 1943 after Italy surrendered to the Allies, which significantly reduced the warships operating in the Adriatic Sea. A German and Croatian crew operated the ship, once again named Niobe, under the German flag. According to Twardowski, however, the ship remained in Italian hands until Germany seized it in September 1943, thereafter turning her over to the Independent State of Croatia as Znaim before retaking the ship and restoring her original name at some point thereafter. Aidan Dodson concurs that the ship remained in Italian hands until their surrender, and states that she was undergoing boiler repairs at Pola at the time. After falling into German hands, there was some debate as to what her name should be, with consideration given to Zenta or Novara in honor of Austro-Hungarian cruisers, but the Germans eventually settled on reverting to her original name. According to Freivogel, the reported names Znajm, Zniam, and Znijam do not mean anything in the Croatian language, and there was probably a confusion with the minelayer Zmaj or Zenta.

Nevertheless, after leaving Italian service the ship's armament was six 8.4 cm (3.3 in) AA guns, four 47 mm AA guns, four 20 mm Oerlikon AA guns, and twenty-six 20 mm Breda AA guns, and she was commissioned on 8 November. On the night of 21/22 September, while she was still refitting, two British motor torpedo boats—MTB 226 and MTB 228—attacked the ship to the northwest of Zara without success. Niobe began escorting convoys in the Adriatic, the first taking place on 13 November, in support of Operation Herbstgewitter. This convoy consisted of several transports carrying units from the 71st Infantry Division to the islands of Cres, Krk, and Lussino.

On 19 December, Niobe ran aground on the island of Silba at around 18:00 as a result of a navigational error. The crew requested tugboats from Pola, but they were unable to pull the ship free. Local Partisans informed the British about the ship's location, and three days later, the British motor torpedo boats MTB 276 and MTB 298 attacked the ship and hit her with two torpedoes, and the tug Parenzo, which had been moored alongside to assist the salvage effort, was hit by a third torpedo and sunk. Nineteen men were killed in the attack. The Germans then abandoned the wreck, apart from a small group tasked with removing or destroying weapons and other equipment. The wreck was then damaged further by the Germans before they abandoned it, and it was later cannibalized for spare parts by the Partisans. The wreck remained on Silba until 1947, when salvage operations began. She was raised and broken up for scrap by 1952.
