= Milan Spasić =

Royal Yugoslav Navy Lieutenant

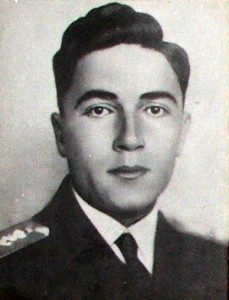
- Born: November 8, 1909; Belgrade, Kingdom of Serbia
- Died: April 17, 1941 (aged 31); Bay of Kotor, Kingdom of Yugoslavia
- Military career
- Allegiance: Yugoslav Royal Navy
- Service years: 1932–1941
- Rank: Naval Lieutenant
- Unit: The destroyer Zagreb
- Conflicts: Invasion of Yugoslavia (World War II)
- Awards

Milan Spasić (November 8, 1909 – April 17, 1941) was a naval Lieutenant of the Royal Yugoslav Navy. During the April War, Spasić, along with his fellow Lieutenant Sergej Mašera, scuttled the destroyer Zagreb in the Bay of Kotor near Tivat to prevent it from falling into the hands of the Italian Royal Navy. Both Spasić and Mašera died in the scuttling.

== Biography ==
=== Before World War II ===
Milan Spasić was born in 1909 in Belgrade, Kingdom of Serbia. He completed both elementary and high school education in his hometown, graduating in 1929 with many honors. He later enrolled in the Naval Military Academy (VII class) in Dubrovnik alongside Sergej Mašera, who would later turn out to be a future comrade. After graduating from the academy in 1932, he continued in his academic studies.

=== April War and death ===
At the time of outbreak of the April War in 1941, Spasić was a lieutenant on the destroyer Zagreb stationed in Dobrota (Bay of Kotor). He was the officer in charge of the ship's torpedoes and mines. Zagreb and the destroyers Beograd and Dubrovnik were the most recent Royal Yugoslav Navy ships at that time. On the 6th of April, they were the target of an air attack by five Regia Aeronautica bombers. The bay was under attack by Italian aircraft once again on April 13, but the bombing did not damage Zagreb. Later, on the 15th of April, the Yugoslav Royal Army asked for a truce. The crews of the ships stationed in the Bay of Kotor were instructed not to open fire on the Axis forces and to surrender peacefully. They were also ordered to not destroy anything.

Most of the sailors landed on the mainland. On the 17th of April, Italian forces began to advance toward the Bay of Kotor. The remaining crew members of the destroyer Zagreb were ordered to abandon ship.

Milan Spasić and Mašera decided that the ship should not be delivered to the Italians, and they refused the order of their commander, Captain Nikola Krizomalija, to abandon the ship. They blew up the ship, and died in the process.

After the two explosions, Zagreb was badly damaged and sank to the shallow bottom. The following day, fishermen found the corpse of Milan Spasić in the sea. He was buried along with Sergej Mašera on 19 April 1941, in the naval cemetery at village Savini near Herceg Novi. Many people came to their funeral, including members of the Italian army. Those in attendance were impressed by the heroism of Spasić and Mašera. They were buried with military honors.

== Legacy of Spasić and Mašera ==
Soon after their feat, their sacrifice was reported by the British newspapers. In 1942, the British Army had already erected within their barracks in Malta a commemorative plaque dedicated to Spasić and Mašera. British journalist David Divine, in his book "Navies in Exile" (London: John Murray, 1944.) stressed the actions of Spasić and Mašera. In the FPR Yugoslavia at the end of the first postwar years, the subject of the two was rarely discussed.

There was little discussion of Spasić and Mašera until the 1960s, following the democratization of the Yugoslavia (Economic reform 1964 /1965) The French produced a film Flammes sur l'Adriatique (Flames on Adriatic, also known as Adriatic Sea of Fire) in 1968, dedicated to this event and directed by Alexandre Astruc and Stjepan Čikeš.

Spasić and Mašera were posthumously awarded the Order of the People's Hero of Yugoslavia by decree of President Tito on 10 September 1973, the 30th anniversary of the establishment of the Yugoslav Navy. A monument stands to honor Spasić and Mašera in Tivat. A youth hostel near the town of Kotor bears the name "Spasić – Mašera”.

== See also ==
- Aleksandar Berić

== Bibliography ==
- Narodni heroji Jugoslavije, Mladost Beograd, 1975. godina (in Serbo-Croatian)
- Tomislav Grgurević: Podvig Spasića i Mašere, 1983. Centar za kulturu, informisanje i dokumentaciju, Tivat (in Serbo-Croatian)
