= Yugoslav destroyer Split =

Destroyer of the Royal Yugoslav Navy

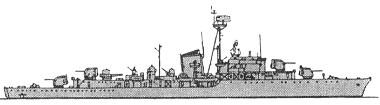
- An early profile drawing of Split

History

Kingdom of Yugoslavia
- Name: Split
- Namesake: City of Split
- Builder: Yarrow Shipbuilders, Split
- Laid down: July 1939
- Fate: Captured while under construction, 15 April 1941

Socialist Federal Republic of Yugoslavia
- Name: Split
- Launched: March 1950
- Acquired: 27 October 1944
- Commissioned: 4 July 1958
- Decommissioned: 1980
- Stricken: 2 February 1984
- Fate: Scrapped, 1986

General characteristics (as designed)
- Type: Destroyer
- Displacement: 2,400 long tons (2,439 t) (Standard)
- Length: 120 m (393 ft 8 in) (o/a)
- Beam: 11.3 m (37 ft 1 in)
- Draft: 3.48 m (11 ft 5 in)
- Installed power: 3 × Yarrow boilers; 55,000 shp (41,000 kW)
- Propulsion: 2 × shafts; 2 × geared steam turbines
- Speed: 38 knots (70 km/h; 44 mph)
- Armament: 5 × single 14 cm (5.5 in) guns; 5 × twin 40 mm (1.6 in) AA guns; 4 × twin 15 mm (0.6 in) AA guns; 2 x triple 533 mm (21 in) torpedo tubes

General characteristics (as completed)
- Beam: 12 m (39 ft 4 in)
- Draft: 3.7 m (12 ft 2 in)
- Installed power: 2 × Admiralty 3-drum boilers; 50,000 shp (37,000 kW)
- Propulsion: 2 × shafts; 2 × geared steam turbines
- Speed: 31.5 knots (58.3 km/h; 36.2 mph)
- Complement: 240
- Sensors & processing systems: SC search radar; SG-1 surface-search radar; Mk 12 fire-control radar; Mk 22 height-finding radar; QGA sonar
- Armament: 4 × single 127 mm (5 in)/38 naval guns; 1 × quad, 2 × twin, 2 × single 40 mm guns; 1 × quintuple 533 mm (21 in) torpedo tubes; 2 × Hedgehog anti-submarine spigot mortars; 6 × Depth charge throwers; 2 × depth charge racks; 40 × mines

The Yugoslav destroyer Split was a large destroyer designed for the Royal Yugoslav Navy in the late 1930s. Construction began in 1939, but she was captured incomplete by the Italians during the invasion of Yugoslavia in April 1941. They continued to build the ship, barring a brief hiatus, but she was not completed before she was scuttled after the Italian surrender in September 1943. The Germans occupied Split and refloated the destroyer later that year, but made no efforts to continue work. The ship was scuttled again before the city was taken over by the Yugoslav Partisans in late 1944. Split was refloated once more, but the new Socialist Federal Republic of Yugoslavia was able to do little with her before the Tito–Stalin Split in 1948 halted most work. Aid and equipment from the United States and the United Kingdom finally allowed her to be completed 20 years after construction began. She was commissioned in July 1958 and served as the Navy's flagship for most of her career. Split became a training ship in the late 1970s after a boiler explosion. She was decommissioned in 1980, and scrapped six years later.

== Design ==
The Yugoslav Navy decided to order a single large destroyer rather than a repeat pair of smaller Beograd-class destroyers in the late 1930s because the Navy's planners didn't believe that the smaller ships could adequately support the raiding strategy that it intended to conduct in the event of a war with Italy. The staff decided on a much larger equivalent of the flotilla leader Dubrovnik that could out-gun any Italian destroyer and cover the escape and return to base of the raiding forces. The French company Ateliers et Chantiers de la Loire was selected and based the new ship on their design for the 2,610-metric-ton (2,570-long-ton) Le Fantasque-class destroyer. She was built by Yarrow Shipbuilders at their shipyard in Split and was named after her place of construction.

The Yugoslavs chose to buy the components from a variety of different nations. The pairs of geared steam turbines and Yarrow boilers were intended to give the ship a speed of 37 knots (69 km/h; 43 mph) from 55,000 shaft horsepower (41,000 kW) and were purchased from Great Britain. The fire-control system, with two directors, and radios were French while the armament was supplied by the Škoda Works of Czechoslovakia.

The ship's designed armament was five 56-caliber 14-centimeter (5.5 in) guns in single mounts, five twin mounts for 67-caliber 40-millimeter (1.6 in) anti-aircraft (AA) guns, eight 15-millimeter (0.6 in) ZB-60 AA guns in four twin-gun mounts, and two triple mounts for 53.3-centimeter (21 in) torpedo tubes.

The Yugoslav emphasis on anti-aircraft defense meant that Split could only have a single funnel to allow the guns as much freedom to fire as possible, which dictated that the boiler rooms were adjacent to the engine room. This made the ship vulnerable to a single torpedo hit in the machinery spaces, which could immobilize her.

== Construction ==
The ship was laid down in July 1939 with her launching scheduled for the following year and completion by the end of 1942. By the time the Italians joined the Germans in invading France in May 1940, only 600 metric tons (590 long tons) of the 1,100 metric tons (1,083 long tons) of material necessary to launch her had been delivered. The British government embargoed her machinery in 1940, despite French protests, when it discovered surreptitious contacts between the Yugoslav and Soviet governments. The Swedish government embargoed the Bofors guns due to the war, and the German control of the Škoda Works meant that the Yugoslavs had to suspend construction of Split.

When the city of Split was captured by the Italians on 14 April 1941, the hull remained undamaged, and the Regia Marina decided to complete the ship after a delay of several months. They renamed the ship Spalato, the Italian name for the city of Split. New machinery was ordered from Franco Tosi, and five 45-caliber 13.5 cm (5.3 in) guns, as many Breda 37 mm (1.5 in) AA guns as could be fitted, and four twin mounts for Breda 20 mm (0.8 in) light AA guns replaced the Czech and Swedish weapons. One torpedo tube mount was removed, and the Italians planned to add depth charge throwers and racks, the capacity for 40 mines, and an EC-3 ter Gufo radar.

The ship was lightly damaged by saboteurs in December, which disrupted progress, and the Regia Marina decided to suspend construction in April 1942 as she remained nearly two years from completion. By late 1942, the Regia Marina's shortage of destroyers had reached a point that every possible hull was needed, and construction restarted at a high priority. This allowed her to be launched on 18 July 1943, but shortly afterwards, a change in the Italian leadership caused any further work to be suspended in August and the resources used in her construction to be diverted to finish a large group of small wooden minesweepers. During the fighting between the Germans and the Italians after the Italian surrender on 9 September, Spalato was scuttled in Split harbor on 24 September. The Germans occupied Split three days later, refloated the ship several weeks later, and stripped her of any valuable material. As part of their scorched-earth strategy as they abandoned Split, the Germans scuttled Spalato and wrecked the shipyard before the Yugoslav Partisans occupied the port on 27 October 1944.

=== Postwar completion ===
The new communist government of Yugoslavia lacked any sizable warships after the end of the war and decided to resurrect Split as the centerpiece of their new navy. The Yugoslav Navy ordered replacement parts for the machinery from Franco Tosi and contacted Škoda in 1948 to get delivery of her original main armament, which had sat out the war in a warehouse. The damage to the shipyard meant that the navy had to tow the ship to the Kvarner Shipyard (formerly the Cantieri navali del Quarnaro) in Rijeka. Shortly afterwards, however, the Tito-Stalin split deprived the ship of her main armament and the technical assistance needed to complete her.

The Yugoslavs re-launched Split in March 1950 to free up the slipway, but no other work was done. In 1953, there was a rapprochement between Yugoslavia and NATO, and the Americans and the British agreed to help complete the ship. The Tosi machinery ordered earlier had been used for other ships, so the British agreed to furnish her propulsion machinery while the Americans provided the ship's armament, fire-control equipment and electronics.

== Description ==
Split had an overall length of 120 meters (393 ft 8 in), a beam of 12 meters (39 ft 4 in), and a draft of 3.7 meters (12 ft 2 in). The ships displaced 2,400 metric tons (2,362 long tons) at standard and 3,000 metric tons (2,953 long tons) at deep load. She was powered by two Parsons geared steam turbines, each driving one propeller shaft, using steam provided by two Admiralty 3-drum boilers. The turbines were designed to produce 50,000 shaft horsepower (37,000 kW), which would propel the ship at 31.5 knots (58.3 km/h; 36.2 mph). Split carried 590 metric tons (581 long tons) of fuel oil, although her range is unknown, and had a crew of 240.

The main armament of Split consisted of four 38-caliber 5-inch (13 cm) guns in single mounts, one superfiring pair each fore and aft of the superstructure. Her anti-aircraft armament consisted of four twin-gun and four single mounts for license-built 40 mm Bofors AA guns. The ship carried one quintuple set of 21-inch torpedo tubes and retained her capacity for 40 mines. For anti-submarine combat, Split was equipped with two Hedgehog spigot mortars, six depth-charge throwers and two depth-charge racks. The ship was fitted with a Mk 37 fire-control director for the 5-inch guns and a Mk 51 director for the AA guns. The Mk 37 director was equipped with a Mk 12 fire-control radar and a Mk 22 height-finding radar. SC and SG-1 search radars completed her radar suite.

== Service ==
Construction proceeded at a snail's pace, and the ship was finally commissioned on 4 July 1958, although she did not enter service until 1959. She immediately became the Navy's flagship and retained that position for most of her career. Split proved to be top-heavy, short ranged, slow and very cramped in service. She accidentally collided with the ex-Italian torpedo boat Biokovo in 1963, damaging the latter so badly that she was immediately struck from the navy list. In the late 1970s, an explosion of one of Split's main boiler steam lines killed all of the men standing watch in the boiler room. The boiler was not repaired, and she was limited to a speed of 24 knots (44 km/h; 28 mph). The ship became a stationary training ship afterwards. She was decommissioned in 1980, struck on 2 February 1984, and scrapped in 1986.

== Bibliography ==
- Freivogel, Zvonimir (1994). "Scrapping of Various Warships". Warship International. XXXI (4). ISSN 0043-0374.
- Freivogel, Zvonimir & Grobmeier, A. H. (2006). "Question 36/05: Armament of Yugoslav Destroyer Leader Split". Warship International. XLIII (4): 362. ISSN 0043-0374.
- Cernuschi, Enrico & O'Hara, Vincent O. (2005). "The Star-Crossed Split". In Jordan, John (ed.). Warship 2005. London: Conway. pp. 97–110. ISBN 1-84486-003-5.
- Gardiner, Robert; Chumbley, Stephen & Budzbon, Przemysław (1995). Conway's All the World's Fighting Ships 1947–1995. Annapolis, Maryland: Naval Institute Press. ISBN 1-55750-132-7.
- Whitley, M. J. (1988). Destroyers of World War Two. Annapolis, Maryland: Naval Institute Press. ISBN 0-87021-326-1.
