= Yugoslav destroyer Ljubljana =

1930s Beograd-class destroyer

Ljubljana
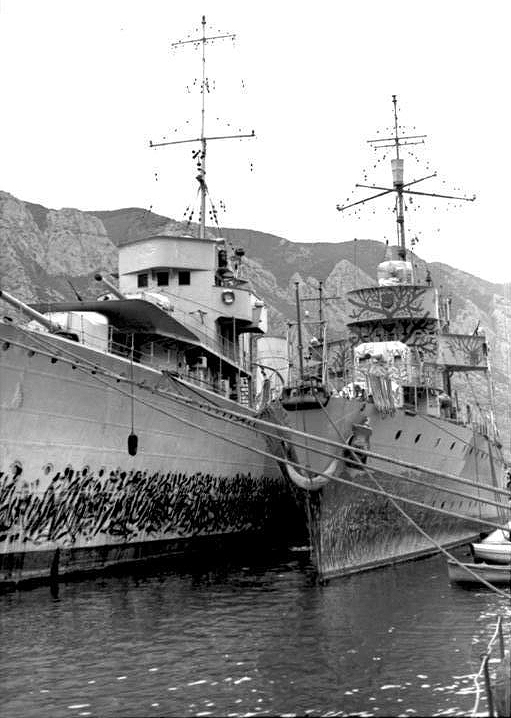
- Ljubljana's sister ship Beograd (right) and the flotilla leader Dubrovnik (left) in the Bay of Kotor after being captured by Italy

History

Kingdom of Yugoslavia
- Name: Ljubljana
- Namesake: Ljubljana
- Laid down: 1936
- Launched: 28 June 1938
- Commissioned: November 1939
- Out of service: 17 April 1941
- Fate: Captured by Italy

Italy
- Name: Lubiana
- Acquired: 17 April 1941
- In service: 1 November 1941
- Fate: Stranded and wrecked off the Tunisian coast on 1 April 1943

General characteristics
- Class & type: Beograd-class destroyer
- Displacement: 1,210 t (1,190 long tons) (standard); 1,655 t (1,629 long tons) (full load)
- Length: 98 m (321 ft 6 in) oa
- Beam: 9.45 m (31 ft)
- Draught: 3.18 m (10 ft 5 in)
- Installed power: 3 × Yarrow water-tube boilers; 40,000–44,000 shp (30,000–33,000 kW)
- Propulsion: 2 × shafts; 2 × Parsons steam turbines
- Speed: 38 knots (70 km/h; 44 mph)
- Complement: 145
- Armament: 4 × single 120 mm (4.7 in) guns; 2 × dual 40 mm (1.6 in) AA guns; 2 × triple 550 mm (21.7 in) torpedo tubes; 2 × 15 mm (0.59 in) machine guns; 30 naval mines

Ljubljana (Serbo-Croatian pronunciation: [ʎubˈʎana]; Cyrillic: Љубљана) was the third and last Beograd-class destroyer built for the Royal Yugoslav Navy (Serbo-Croatian: Kraljevska mornarica, Краљевска морнарица; КМ) in the late 1930s, and designed to operate as part of a division led by the flotilla leader Dubrovnik. She entered KM service in November 1939, was armed with a main battery of four Škoda 120 mm (4.7 in) guns in superfiring single mounts – two forward and two aft of the superstructure – and she had a practical top speed of 35 knots (65 km/h; 40 mph).

In 1940, Ljubljana ran aground on a reef off the Yugoslav port of Šibenik and sank due to the serious damage caused to her hull. After considerable effort she was refloated and then towed to the naval arsenal at Tivat in the Bay of Kotor for repairs. This incident resulted in her gaining a reputation as an "unlucky ship" with Yugoslav sailors. Yugoslavia entered World War II when the German-led Axis powers invaded in April 1941, and Ljubljana – still under repair – was captured by the Italians. After repairs and refitting, including replacement of her anti-aircraft armament, she saw service from November 1942 with the Royal Italian Navy under the name Lubiana, mainly as a convoy escort on routes between Italy and Greece and Italy and Tunisia. She was lost on 1 April 1943, when a navigational error was made in poor visibility off the Tunisian coast. She ran aground and was stranded and then abandoned due to heavy seas, and was declared a total loss.

== Background ==
In the early 1930s, the Royal Yugoslav Navy pursued the flotilla leader concept, which involved building large destroyers similar to the World War I Royal Navy V and W-class destroyers. In the interwar French Navy, flotilla leaders were intended to operate as half-flotillas of three ships, or with one flotilla leader operating alongside several smaller destroyers. The KM decided to build three such flotilla leaders—ships that could reach high speeds and would have long endurance. The endurance requirement reflected Yugoslav plans to deploy the flotilla leaders to the central Mediterranean, where they would be able to operate alongside French and British warships. This resulted in the construction of the destroyer Dubrovnik in 1930–1931. Soon after she was ordered, the onset of the Great Depression and attendant economic pressures meant that only one ship of the planned half-flotilla was ever built.

British diplomatic staff reported that although three large destroyers were not going to be built, the intent that Dubrovnik might operate with several smaller destroyers persisted. In 1934, the KM decided to acquire three smaller destroyers to operate in a division led by Dubrovnik, leading to the building of the Beograd class.

== Description and construction ==
The Beograd–class ships were built to a design based on a modified version of the French Bourrasque class, and the third and last ship of the class, Ljubljana, was built by Jadranska brodogradilišta at Split, Yugoslavia, under French supervision. This shipyard was jointly owned by Yarrow and Chantiers de la Loire. The Beograd class had an improved hull shape from the Bourrasque class, especially aft where the depth charge racks under the main deck were dispensed with. Their silhouette was also lower and more modern than the Bourrasque class, with two funnels of the same height rather than three of differing heights. The lower sections of the funnels were inside the superstructure in the midsection of the ship aft of the forecastle, which also housed the boiler room access and some offices. The officers' accommodation was aft under the quarterdeck and in the deckhouse, and the accommodation for the petty officers and sailors was forward. Overall, the class were fast but lightly built and top heavy, and had limited range.

Ljubljana was named for the Yugoslav city of Ljubljana. She had an overall length of 98 m (321 ft 6 in), a beam of 9.45 m (31 ft), and a normal draught of 3.18 m (10 ft 5 in). The ship's standard displacement was 1,210 tonnes (1,190 long tons), and she displaced 1,655 tonnes (1,629 long tons) at full load. Ljubljana's crew consisted of 145 personnel, including both officers and enlisted men.

The ship was powered by a pair of Parsons steam turbines driving two propellers, using steam generated by three oil-fired Yarrow water-tube boilers which were arranged with a single boiler in the forward boiler room and two boilers in the aft boiler room. Her turbines were installed in two engine rooms one behind the other aft of the boiler rooms, with the forward turbine driving the starboard shaft and the aft turbine driving the port shaft. Total power was rated at 40,000–44,000 shaft horsepower (30,000–33,000 kW) and Ljubljana was designed to reach a top speed of 38 knots (70 km/h; 44 mph), although her sister Beograd achieved 39 kn (72 km/h; 45 mph) during her trials. Ljubljana was only able to reach a practical top speed of 35 knots (65 km/h; 40 mph) in service. She carried 120 tonnes (120 long tons) of fuel oil, in nine bunkers located on either side of the boiler rooms and in the double bottom directly below the bridge. The bunker oil in the double bottom adversely affected her trim. Her range in 1941 while in Italian service was 1,200 nautical miles (2,200 km; 1,400 mi) and 16 kn (30 km/h; 18 mph).

The initial intention to arm the class with four Czechoslovak-built Škoda 140 mm (5.5 in) L/56 (Note: L/56 denotes the length of the barrel. In this case, the L/56 gun is 56 calibre, meaning that the barrel was 56 times as long as the diameter of its bore.) guns – as carried by Dubrovnik – was quickly dropped, as they were too heavy for the smaller destroyers. Instead, Ljubljana's main armament consisted of four Škoda 120 mm (4.7 in) L/46 guns in single superfiring mounts, two forward of the superstructure and two aft, protected by gun shields. A total of 2,400 shells were carried for the main guns. Her fire-control system was provided by the Dutch firm Hazemeyer, with the forward firing director with a 4 m (13 ft) rangefinder on the bridge, and the 3 m (9.8 ft) aft director mounted on the aft deckhouse. Her secondary armament was originally intended to be four Škoda 47 mm (1.9 in) anti-aircraft guns in two twin mounts, but due to delays in the development of these new guns, Bofors 40 mm (1.6 in) L/60 guns were installed instead. A total of 10,000 rounds were carried for these guns. Their mounts were located on either side of the aft shelter deck. Two Zbrojovka Brno Model 60 15 mm (0.59 in) machine guns were installed in single mounts on the bridge wings. Two French triple-mount torpedo tubes were chosen, but sources vary regarding whether these were older 550 mm (21.7 in) tubes or newer 533 mm (21.0 in) tubes. (Note: Freivogel notes that the newer 533 mm French torpedoes could probably be fired from 550 mm tubes.) The torpedo tubes were mounted on the centreline forward and aft of the deckhouse, which was located between the aft funnel and the quarterdeck. A searchlight was mounted on top of the deckhouse. Ljubljana could also carry 30 naval mines, delivered from mine rails aft. Ljubljana was also fitted with two depth charge racks aft.

Ljubljana was laid down in 1936, launched on 28 June 1938, completed on 23 September 1939, and was commissioned into the KM in November 1939.

== Career ==
=== Yugoslav service ===
Soon after commissioning, Ljubljana participated in an anti-submarine warfare exercise in the passages between the large islands of Mljet and Korčula off the Dalmatian coast on 23 January 1940. During the exercise, Ljubljana's crew noticed that she was veering to starboard – a steering machinery malfunction was suspected – and the secondary steering system was engaged. The exercise included both her sister ships, and the following day the division sailed towards Šibenik for a port visit to familiarise the population with the new destroyers. The ships were ordered to sail to Šibenik through the narrow St. Anthony Channel, but due to the strong northerly wind blowing, their commanding officers requested that they be permitted to anchor outside the channel until the wind dropped. This request was denied, as the public were waiting for their arrival, along with the commander-in-chief of the KM, Kontraadmiral Marijan Polić. As she passed through the narrowest point in the channel near the harbour entrance about 17:05, Ljubljana's stern swung to starboard and struck underwater rocks on the eastern side of the channel. The starboard hull and the starboard shaft were damaged, and the damage to the latter resulted in eccentric rotation of the starboard propeller which tore into and breached the hull near the steering machinery. Both turbines were put out of action, as the forward turbine driving the starboard shaft had to be disengaged, and the engine room of the aft turbine was flooded. Without power, Ljubljana's momentum carried her forward into the eastern part of Šibenik harbour where she came to a stop. The extent of the damage was initially underestimated, and both anchors were dropped. This action prevented her being towed to safety by two tugs, and they were only able to save the crew, except for one sailor, who drowned in the aft engine room. At about 6:15 PM Ljubljana capsized and sank. She came to rest upside down at a relatively shallow depth on the bottom of the harbour, inclined to port on a 120 degree angle. The resulting naval court of inquiry led to the early retirement of almost the entire staff of the Yugoslav fleet headquarters.

No salvage companies in Yugoslavia had the equipment and expertise to raise Ljubljana, so the Tripkovich firm from Trieste was engaged for the task. The director of the company, Gottfried Freiherr von Banfield – the most successful Austro-Hungarian naval pilot of World War I – was known to many former Austro-Hungarian naval personnel then serving in the KM. Banfield arrived in Šibenik with the 247 t (243 long tons) tug Gladiator four days after Ljubljana had sunk. His team was joined by the KM tug Jaki and Italian tugs Audax and Cyclops, with the KM salvage vessel Spasilac acting as the headquarters for the operation. It was hoped that the salvage could be completed within two weeks, but the winter sea and weather conditions made it very difficult. During one attempt, hydraulic cylinders borrowed from the Royal Italian Navy came free when the tow cable parted, and floated away to be collected by Dubrovnik. On the night of 29 February/1 March, the Italian ocean liner SS Leonardo da Vinci accidentally struck the submerged Ljubljana, further damaging her rudder and propellers. Ljubljana's hull was sealed, and on 10 May she was brought onto an even keel, resting on a bed of 80,000 sandbags. Eight days later, the first attempt to raise her failed after she rose only one metre before the cables parted. She was finally raised on 10 July in the presence of Banfield and the new KM commander-in-chief, Kontraadmiral Julijan Luterotti. Ljubljana was then towed to Tivat in the Bay of Kotor for repairs. This incident, so soon after her commissioning, led to her being considered an "unlucky ship" by Yugoslav sailors.

=== Italian service ===
In April 1941, Yugoslavia was invaded by the Axis powers, and Ljubljana was captured at Tivat by the Royal Italian Navy on 17 April, where she was still undergoing repairs. The ship was towed to Pola for refitting and repair. (Note: The naval historian John Roberts states she was captured at Šibenik, and both Roberts and the naval historian Maurizio Brescia state that after capture she was towed to the Bay of Kotor and then Fiume for repairs, but as the most recent and specialised Yugoslav naval history source, Zvonimir Freivogel has been preferred on this point.) Her main guns were retained, but a single mount 37 mm (1.5 in) gun replaced each of her 40 mm guns and a third single 37 mm gun replaced the searchlight on the deckhouse. Her 15 mm machine guns were also removed, and eight single Breda Model 35 20 mm (0.79 in) L/65 guns were added to her armament, two of which replaced the aft torpedo tubes. Both firing directors were removed, with the forward one replaced with an Italian RM-2 director on the bridge. Her funnel tops were also cut to a more raked angle, and she was painted in a dazzle camouflage scheme.

The ship was officially commissioned into the Royal Italian Navy under the name Lubiana using the identification letters "LA" on 1 November 1941, but was not actually operational until late October or possibly November 1942. She was attached to the 1st Destroyer Flotilla of the 1st Squadron, operating in the Ionian Sea and the southern Adriatic. She served as an escort until April 1943, operating on the Tunisian supply route from the beginning of 1943. However, her first identified escort was of the captured Greek tanker Patrakis Nomikos – of 7,020 gross register tons (GRT) – from Brindisi in southern Italy to Patras in western Greece in late November 1942. From 9 February to 22 March 1943, Lubiana participated in a series of troop transport convoys for the German and Italian armies in North Africa. These included the escort of the motor vessel Ombrina from Taranto in southern Italy via Palermo in Sicily to Bizerte in Tunisia between 21 and 23 February, and the escort of the motor vessels Marco Foscarini and Niccolo Tommaseo and the steamship Foggia between Taranto and Bizerte over the period 17 to 19 March.

The ship was then involved in escorting another convoy to Tunisia commencing on 27 March, including her final escort, of the tanker Bivona, and the steamships Giacomo C, Aquila and Le Borgne to Tunisia. In bad visibility and poor weather, Lubiana's crew made a navigational error, and along with Le Borgne and Aquila she was grounded at about 04:00 on 1 April, approximately 1.6 kilometres (1 mi) east of Ras El Ahmar – about 8 nmi (15 km; 9.2 mi) west of the Cap Bon Peninsula – while entering the Gulf of Tunis. Due to heavy seas and adverse weather, it was impossible to salvage Lubiana, and she was abandoned, wrecked on the rocks, and declared a total loss. (Note: According to the naval historian Marek Twardowski, she was sunk off the Tunisian coast by British aircraft on 1 April 1943.) While in Italian service, Lubiana undertook 46 missions, including 18 convoy escorts between Italy and Greece, and Italy and Tunisia, and also completed six troop transfers, conducted 12 trials, and 10 other missions, sailed 8,914 nmi (16,509 km; 10,258 mi) and burned 2,905 t (2,859 long tons) of fuel oil.
