= Beograd-class destroyer =

Class of three destroyers built for the Royal Yugoslav Navy in the late 1930s

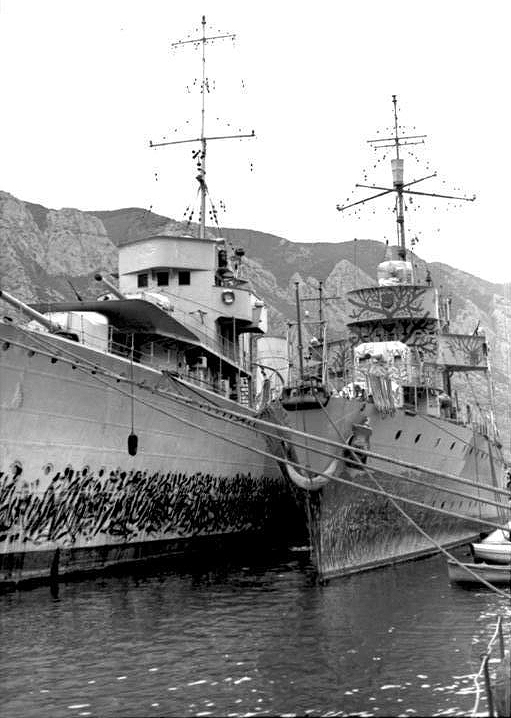
- The name ship of the class, Beograd, (right) and the flotilla leader Dubrovnik in the Bay of Kotor after being captured by Italy in April 1941

Class overview
- Name: Beograd class
- Builders: Ateliers et Chantiers de la Loire; Jadranska brodogradilišta
- Operators: Royal Yugoslav Navy; (Italy) Regia Marina; Kriegsmarine
- Preceded by: Dubrovnik
- Succeeded by: Split
- Built: 1937–1939
- In service: 1939–1945
- Planned: 3
- Completed: 3
- Lost: 3

General characteristics
- Class & type: Destroyer
- Displacement: 1,210 tonnes (1,190 long tons) (standard); 1,655 tonnes (1,629 long tons) (full load)
- Length: 98 m (321 ft 6 in)
- Beam: 9.45 m (31 ft 0 in)
- Draught: 3.18 m (10 ft 5 in)
- Installed power: 3 × Yarrow water-tube boilers; 40,000 shp (30,000 kW)
- Propulsion: 2 × shafts; Curtis or Parsons steam turbines
- Speed: 35 knots (65 km/h; 40 mph)
- Range: 1,000 nautical miles (1,900 km; 1,200 mi)
- Complement: 145
- Armament: 4 × single 120 mm (4.7 in) guns; 2 × twin 40 mm (1.6 in) AA guns; 2 × triple 550 mm (22 in) torpedo tubes; 2 × machine guns; 30 naval mines

The Beograd class of destroyers consisted of three ships built for the Yugoslav Royal Navy in the late 1930s, a variant of the French Bourrasque class. Beograd was constructed in France, and Zagreb and Ljubljana were built in the Kingdom of Yugoslavia. In January 1940, Ljubljana struck a reef off the port of Šibenik and was still under repair when the German-led Axis invasion of Yugoslavia commenced in April 1941. During the invasion, Zagreb was scuttled to prevent its capture, and the Italians captured the other two ships. The Royal Italian Navy operated Beograd and Ljubljana as convoy escorts between Italy, the Aegean Sea, and North Africa, under the names Sebenico and Lubiana respectively. Lubiana was lost in the Gulf of Tunis in April 1943; Sebenico was seized by the Germans in September 1943 after the Italian surrender and was subsequently operated by the German Navy as TA43. There are conflicting reports about the fate of TA43, but it was lost in the war's final weeks.

In 1967, a French film was made about the scuttling of Zagreb. In 1973, the President of Yugoslavia and wartime Partisan leader Josip Broz Tito posthumously awarded the two officers who scuttled Zagreb with the Order of the People's Hero.

== Background ==
Following the demise of the Austro-Hungarian Empire at the conclusion of World War I, the Kingdom of Serbs, Croats and Slovenes (KSCS) was created. Austria-Hungary transferred the vessels of the former Austro-Hungarian Navy to the new nation. The Kingdom of Italy was unhappy with this and convinced the Allies to share the Austro-Hungarian ships among the victorious powers. As a result, the only modern sea-going vessels left to the KSCS were 12 torpedo boats, and it had to build its naval forces almost from scratch.

The name of the state was changed to the Kingdom of Yugoslavia in 1929. In the early 1930s, the Yugoslav Royal Navy (Serbo-Croatian Latin: Kraljevska mornarica; Serbo-Croatian Cyrillic: Краљевска морнарица; KM) pursued the flotilla leader concept, which involved building large destroyers similar to the World War I Royal Navy V and W-class destroyers, and drew on the experience of the French Navy during the Adriatic Campaign of World War I. In the interwar French Navy, these ships were intended to operate with smaller destroyers, or as half-flotillas of three ships. The Royal Yugoslav Navy decided to build three such flotilla leaders, ships that could reach high speeds and have long endurance. The endurance requirement reflected Yugoslav plans to deploy the ships to the central Mediterranean, where they would be able to operate alongside French and British warships. This resulted in the construction of the destroyer Dubrovnik in 1930–1931. Soon after she was ordered, the onset of the Great Depression meant that only one ship of the planned half-flotilla was ever built.

Although the other two planned large destroyers would not be built, the idea that Dubrovnik might operate with several smaller destroyers persisted. In 1934, buoyed by a special credit of 500 million dinars for an enlargement and modernisation program, the KM decided to acquire three such destroyers to operate in a division led by Dubrovnik. The Beograd class was a variant of the French Bourrasque class, which had a strong main battery hampered by a slow rate-of-fire and combined with a weak anti-submarine suite. The French design was also top-heavy, and the forward section of the hull was too narrow, resulting in a wet forecastle in any sea state. These characteristics were combined with limited endurance.

The name ship of the class, Beograd, was built by Ateliers et Chantiers de la Loire at Nantes, France. In contrast, the remaining ships of the class, Zagreb and Ljubljana, were built by Jadranska brodogradilišta at Split, Yugoslavia, under French supervision. Two more ships of the class were planned but not built. The Jadranska brodogradilišta shipyard at Kraljevica was responsible for the construction and delivery of boilers and other machinery.

== Description and construction ==
The ships had an overall length of 98 m (321 ft 6 in), a beam of 9.45 m (31 ft 0 in), and a normal draught of 3.18 m (10 ft 5 in). Their standard displacement was 1,210 tonnes (1,190 long tons), increasing to 1,655 tonnes (1,629 long tons) at full load. Beograd was powered by Curtis steam turbines, and Zagreb and Ljubljana used Parsons steam turbines. Regardless of the turbines used, they drove two propellers, using steam generated by three Yarrow water-tube boilers. Their turbines were rated at 40,000–44,000 shp (30,000–33,000 kW) and they were designed to propel the ships at a top speed of 38–39 knots (70–72 km/h; 44–45 mph), although they were only able to reach a practical top speed of 35 knots (65 km/h; 40 mph) in service. They carried 120 tonnes (120 long tons) of fuel oil, which gave them a radius of action of 1,000 nautical miles (1,900 km; 1,200 mi). Their crews consisted of 145 personnel, including officers and enlisted men.

Main armament consisted of four Škoda 120 mm (4.7 in) L/46 (Note: L/46 denotes the length of the gun. In this case, the L/46 gun is 46 calibre, meaning that the gun was 46 times as long as the diameter of its bore.) superfiring guns in single mounts, two forward of the superstructure and two aft, protected by gun shields. Secondary armament consisted of four Škoda 40 mm (1.6 in) L/67 anti-aircraft guns in two twin-gun mounts, located on either side of the aft shelter deck. The ships were also equipped with two triple mounts of 550 mm (22 in) torpedo tubes and two machine guns. Their fire-control systems were provided by the Dutch firm of Hazemayer. As built, they could also carry 30 naval mines.

== Ships ==
List of Beograd-class destroyers
Ship	Builder	Laid down	Launched	Commissioned	Fate
Beograd	Ateliers et Chantiers de la Loire, Nantes	1936	23 December 1937	28 April 1939	Captured by Italy, 17 April 1941, renamed Sebenico; Captured by Germans, 1943, renamed TA43; Scuttled/sunk 30 April/1 May 1945
Zagreb	Jadranska brodogradilišta, Split	1936	30 March 1938	August 1939	Scuttled, 17 April 1941
Ljubljana	Jadranska brodogradilišta, Split	1936	28 June 1938	December 1939	Captured by Italy, 17 April 1941, renamed Lubiana; Lost 1 April 1943

== Service ==
At the time of the outbreak of World War II in September 1939, only Beograd and Zagreb had been commissioned, with Ljubljana being brought into service three months after the war started. Their only significant pre-war task was undertaken by Beograd in May 1939 and involved transporting a large portion of Yugoslavia's gold reserve to the United Kingdom for safekeeping. On 24 January 1940, Ljubljana ran into a reef off the Yugoslav port of Šibenik. The hull side was breached, and despite efforts to get the ship into the port, it sank close to shore, and some of the crew swam to safety. One crew member died, and the captain was arrested pending an investigation.

When Yugoslavia was invaded by the German-led Axis powers on 6 April 1941, Beograd and Zagreb were allocated to the 1st Torpedo Division at the Bay of Kotor along with Dubrovnik, but Ljubljana was still under repair at Šibenik. On 9 April, Beograd and other vessels were tasked with supporting an attack on the Italian enclave of Zara on the Dalmatian coast, but the naval prong of the attack was aborted when Beograd suffered engine damage from near misses by Italian aircraft. She returned to the Bay of Kotor for repairs. Beograd and Ljubljana were captured in port by Italian forces on 17 April, but on the same day, two of Zagreb's officers scuttled her to prevent her capture, and were killed by the resulting explosions.

In Italian service, Beograd and Ljubljana were repaired, re-armed, and renamed Sebenico and Lubiana respectively. Sebenico was commissioned into the Royal Italian Navy in August 1941, and Lubiana in October or November 1942. They both served mainly as convoy escorts between Italy and the Aegean and North Africa, with Sebenico completing more than 100 convoy escort missions over a two-year period. Neither ship was involved in any notable action. On 1 April 1943, Lubiana was either sunk off the Tunisian coast by British aircraft, or ran aground in the Gulf of Tunis and was lost. Sebenico was captured by the Germans in Venice after the Italian Armistice in September 1943 in a damaged condition. She was repaired, re-armed, and renamed TA43 and entered service in the Kriegsmarine (German Navy). TA43 served on escort and mine-laying duties in the northern Adriatic Sea, but saw little action. One source states that she was damaged by artillery fire on 30 April 1945 at Trieste and then scuttled, with others suggesting she was scuttled on 1 May.

A 1967 French film, Flammes sur l'Adriatique (Adriatic Sea of Fire), portrayed the scuttling of Zagreb and the events leading up to it. In 1973, the President of Yugoslavia and wartime Partisan leader Josip Broz Tito posthumously awarded the Order of the People's Hero to the two officers who scuttled Zagreb.
