= Sergej Mašera =

Yugoslav Royal Navy Lieutenant

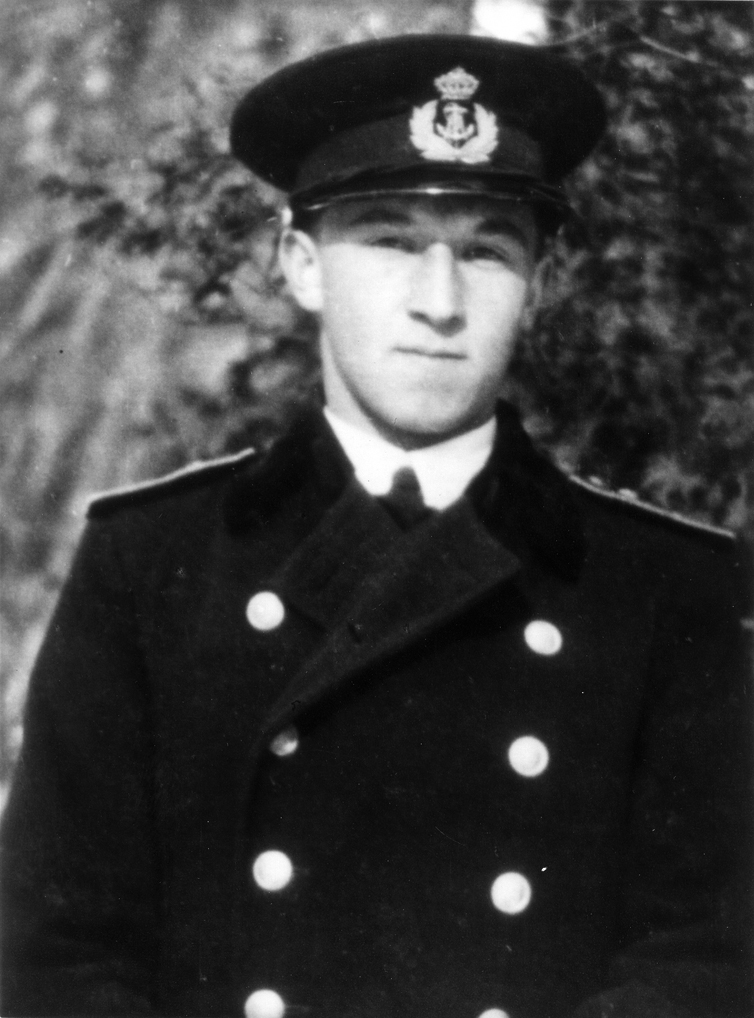
- Naval Lieutenant of the Yugoslav Royal Navy
- Born: May 11, 1912; Gorizia, Austria-Hungary
- Died: April 17, 1941 (aged 28); Bay of Kotor, Kingdom of Yugoslavia
- Military career
- Allegiance: Yugoslav Royal Navy
- Service years: 1932–1941
- Rank: Naval Lieutenant
- Unit: the destroyer Zagreb
- Conflicts: Invasion of Yugoslavia (World War II)
- Awards

Sergej Mašera (May 11, 1912 – April 17, 1941) was a naval Lieutenant of the Yugoslav Royal Navy. At the end of the April War, Mašera, along with his fellow Lieutenant Milan Spasić, scuttled the destroyer Zagreb in the Bay of Kotor near Tivat to prevent its capture by the Italian Royal Navy (Regia Marina Italiana). Both lieutenants died in the explosion, and were posthumously made members of the Order of the People's Hero.

== Biography ==
=== Before World War II ===
Sergej Mašera was born in 1912 to a Slovene family in Gorizia, part of the Austro-Hungarian County of Gorizia and Gradisca (now in Italy). After the end of World War I, his family fled from the Italian-administered Julian March to the Kingdom of Serbs, Croats and Slovenes (Yugoslavia), in order to escape the violent policies of Fascist Italianization. They first settled in Slovenian Carinthia and then in Ljubljana. In Ljubljana, Masera received primary and secondary education before enrolling in the Naval Military Academy (VII class) in Dubrovnik. He graduated in 1932, after three years, with the rank of Corvette Lieutenant.

=== April War and death ===
At the outbreak of the April War in 1941, Sergej Mašera was a lieutenant on the destroyer Zagreb stationed in Dobrota on the Bay of Kotor. He was the First Officer in charge of the ship's artillery.

At that time, Zagreb (together with the destroyers Belgrade and Dubrovnik) was one of the most recent Yugoslav Navy ships, and was therefore the prime target of an air attack of five Regia Aeronautica bombers on the 6th of April. The attack was carried out from a great height, however, and no damage was suffered. Italian aircraft bombed the Bay once again on the 13th, but even then did not damage Zagreb. Two days later, the demoralized Yugoslav Royal Army asked for a truce, and the crews of all ships stationed in the Bay of Kotor were instructed to cease fire and surrender peacefully. Most of the sailors landed on the mainland. On the 17th of April Italian forces began to arrive in the Bay. The remaining crew members of Zagreb (approximately 14 men) were ordered to abandon ship.

Sergej Mašera and his schoolmate Lieutenant Milan Spasić decided that the ship should not be delivered to the Italians. They refused to follow the order of their commander Captain Nikola Krizomali to abandon the ship.

After two explosions, Zagreb was badly damaged and sank. The body of Sergej Mašera disappeared in the explosion, while the body of Milan Spasić was found the next day by fishermen. Spasić was buried on 19 April 1941, in the naval cemetery at the village of Savina near Herceg Novi. Many people attended the funeral (which also commemorated the death of Sergej Mašera). A detachment of the Italian army also attended and were so impressed by the heroism of the two men that they afforded each full military honors. The name of Sergej Mašera is engraved on the monument at the military cemetery in Savina where Milan Spasić is buried.

== Legacy of Spasić and Mašera ==
Soon after the funeral, the two men's story was reported in the British newspaper The Daily Mirror. In 1942, the British Army in Malta erected a Commemorative plaque dedicated to Mašera & Spasić within their barracks. The British journalist Arthur Durham Divine, in his book Navies in Exile, also honored the feat of Spasić and Mašera. In contrast, nothing much was said or written about Spasić and Mašera in the FPR Yugoslavia during the postwar years. Few were even aware of their existence.

During the war, King Peter II of Yugoslavia had been accused of collaborating with the Axis powers through the Chetniks. These charges were informally extended to include all royal officers, which cast suspicion on the authenticity of Mašera & Spasić's actions. In addition, their deed did not fit with the idea spread in newly communist Yugoslavia that only communists would have enough patriotism to resist the occupying forces.

The two men remained unknown until the democratization of Yugoslavia in the 1960s (Economic reform 1964 /1965). In 1968, a French film entitled Flammes sur l'Adriatique (also called Adriatic Sea of Fire) commemorated the destruction of Zagreb and the heroism of Mašera & Spasić. Awareness of the men and their actions began to grow during this time—due, in part, to the film, but also to changing opinions about the period during and after World War II. On the 10 September 1973, the two men were declared People's Heroes of Yugoslavia by President Tito for the 30th anniversary of the Yugoslav War Navy.

Lieutenants Mašera & Spasić have been commemorated in other ways as well. Several Yugoslav cities have streets named after them, such as Mašerin prilaz in the Siget settlement in Novi Zagreb. Many Slovenian towns also have streets named after the men, including Ljubljana, Nova Gorica, and Koper. Nova Gorica has a monument to Sergej Mašera. In similar fashion, the city park in the Montenegrin town Tivat contains a monument to the events that took place in the nearby Bay of Kotor. Since 1967 a Maritime Museum in Piran, far from the Bay of Kotor, has also carried the name Sergej Mašera. The Youth Hostel near the town of Kotor is likewise named "Spasić - Mašera."

== See also ==
- Aleksandar Berić

== Bibliography ==
- Narodni heroji Jugoslavije, Mladost Beograd, 1975. godina (in Serbo-Croatian)
- Tomislav Grgurević: Podvig Spasića i Mašere, 1983. Centar za kulturu, informisanje i dokumentaciju, Tivat (in Serbo-Croatian)
