= Yugoslav gunboat Beli Orao =

Yugoslav Royal Navy's royal yacht

Beli Orao
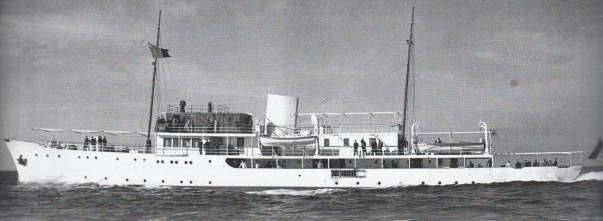
- Beli Orao at Trieste, Italy, after being completed

History

Kingdom of Yugoslavia
- Name: Beli Orao
- Namesake: The double-headed white eagle on the Yugoslav coat of arms
- Builder: Cantieri Riuniti dell'Adriatico in Trieste
- Laid down: 23 December 1938
- Launched: 3 June 1939
- Commissioned: 29 October 1939
- Out of service: April 1941
- Fate: Captured by Italy

Italy
- Name: Alba then; Zagabria
- Acquired: April 1941
- Out of service: September 1943
- Fate: Returned to Yugoslavia in December 1943

Kingdom of Yugoslavia
- Name: Beli Orao
- Acquired: December 1943
- Fate: Transferred to Yugoslav Navy post-war

Federal People's Republic of Yugoslavia
- Name: Biokovo then; Jadranka
- Acquired: Post-World War II
- Fate: Scrapped after 1978

General characteristics
- Displacement: 567 t (558 long tons); 660–661 t (650–651 long tons) (full load)
- Length: 60.08 m (197 ft 1 in) (pp); 60.45–65 m (198 ft 4 in – 213 ft 3 in) (oa)
- Beam: 7.95–8.08 m (26 ft 1 in – 26 ft 6 in)
- Draught: 2.8–2.84 m (9 ft 2 in – 9 ft 4 in)
- Installed power: 1,900 bhp (1,400 kW) or 2,200 bhp (1,600 kW)
- Propulsion: 2 × diesel engines; 2 × shafts
- Speed: 18.5 knots (34.3 km/h; 21.3 mph)
- Complement: Unknown
- Armament: 2 × 40 mm (1.6 in) guns; 2 × machine guns

Beli Orao (Serbo-Croatian for 'White Eagle') was a royal yacht built in 1938–39 for the Yugoslav Royal Navy, which intended her to serve as a patrol boat, escort, or guard ship in wartime. Upon completion, she was pressed into service as the admiralty yacht – used by senior admirals for transport and to review fleet exercises. She was captured in April 1941 by the Italians during the World War II Axis invasion of Yugoslavia. The Regia Marina (Italian Royal Navy) replaced her guns and used her as a gunboat for harbour protection and coastal escort duties, briefly as Alba then Zagabria. She was then used to train anti-submarine warfare specialists from the naval base at La Spezia.

After the Italian armistice with the Allies in September 1943, Zagabria escaped capture by the Germans and was returned to the Yugoslav Royal Navy-in-exile in December that year. Refitted, and under her original name of Beli Orao, she became a tender for a flotilla of motor gunboats that had been loaned to the Yugoslav Royal Navy-in-exile by the British Royal Navy. In this role she operated out of the British Crown Colony of Malta, and in the Tyrrhenian Sea off the western coast of Italy, and later in the Adriatic Sea off the Yugoslav coast. After the war she remained in Yugoslav hands under the names Biokovo then Jadranka, serving as a naval yacht and as a presidential yacht for the President of Yugoslavia Josip Broz Tito, and also as a dispatch boat. In 1978, she was still in service as a yacht, but was scrapped soon after.

== Background, description and construction ==
Beli Orao was ordered from Cantieri Riuniti dell'Adriatico (CRDA) at Trieste, Italy, in 1938, originally designed as a guard ship for the Yugoslav Financial Guard. During her construction, the plans were varied several times by the Yugoslav government, so that she was completed as a royal yacht for use by the regent Prince Paul during peacetime. In wartime, she was to be used as a patrol boat, escort, or guard ship. The final design gave her the appearance of a motor yacht or fast passenger ship.

Sources vary on Beli Orao's length overall; both 60.45 metres (198 ft 4 in) and 65 metres (213 ft 3 in) are given. She had a length between perpendiculars of 60.08 m (197 ft 1 in), a beam of 7.95 m (26 ft 1 in) or 8.08 m (26 ft 6 in), and a draught of 2.8 m (9 ft 2 in) or 2.84 m (9 ft 4 in). She had a standard displacement of 567 tonnes (558 long tons), and displaced around 660 t (650 long tons) at full load. She was powered by two CRDA-Sulzer diesel engines driving two propellers. Sources vary on the power of her engines. Conway's All the World's Fighting Ships 1922–1946 states that they generated 1,900 brake horsepower (1,400 kW), but the naval historian Zvonimir Freivogel gives a higher output of 2,200 bhp (1,600 kW). The engines were designed to drive her at a cruising speed of 17 knots (31 km/h; 20 mph) and a top speed of 18.5 kn (34.3 km/h; 21.3 mph). The size of her crew is unknown. For wartime service she was to be armed with two 40-millimetre (1.6 in) anti-aircraft guns, and two 15 mm (0.59 in) or 7.9 mm (0.31 in) machine guns. Beli Orao, named after the double-headed white eagle on the Yugoslav coat of arms, was laid down on 23 December 1938, launched on 3 June 1939, and completed on 29 October of that year, after World War II had broken out.

== Service history ==
When Beli Orao was completed, Yugoslavia had not yet been drawn into the war, but she was immediately pressed into service to replace the admiralty yacht Vila, which was used by senior admirals for transport and to review fleet exercises. This changed with the April 1941 German-led Axis invasion of the country. At the time of the invasion, Beli Orao was located at the main navy fleet base at the Bay of Kotor. When the fleet flagship, the obsolete light cruiser Dalmacija, was tasked to participate in an attack against the Italian enclave of Zara, the fleet staff transferred to Beli Orao. After the Italians captured Kotor, the commander-in-chief of the fleet, Rear Admiral Emil Domainko, who was aboard Beli Orao anchored off Krtole within the bay, was summoned to meet with an Italian general whose troops were occupying Kotor. Beli Orao then hosted the negotiations between the fleet staff and the Regia Marina (Italian Royal Navy) regarding the surrender of the fleet. Domainko was allowed to sail in Beli Orao to Herceg Novi at the mouth of the bay, but returned to Kotor to surrender the ship.

She was put into service with the Regia Marina as a gunboat, initially as Alba (Dawn), although her name was soon changed to Zagabria (the Italian name for Zagreb), probably to compensate for the fact that the Yugoslav destroyer Zagreb had been scuttled by two of her officers instead of being surrendered. Zagabria's two 40 mm guns were replaced with two Oerlikon 20 mm (0.79 in) L/70 guns. At the time, she was one of the largest gunboats operated by the Italians. Like other Italian gunboats, she was employed only on harbour protection and coastal escort duties.

Zagabria was then attached to the anti-submarine warfare (ASW) school at La Spezia on the Ligurian Sea, where she was equipped with hydrophones for detecting submarines. Until the Italian armistice with the Allies in September 1943, she was used to train ASW specialists for service on corvettes, destroyers and torpedo boats. At the time of the armistice, Zagabria escaped from impending German capture by sailing to Augusta, Sicily. On 19 September, she departed for Valletta in the British Crown Colony of Malta with the Gabbiano-class corvettes Folaga and Gru, but had to turn back to deliver the Italian admiral Prince Aimone, Duke of Aosta, to Taranto in southern Italy, as the terms of the armistice did not allow him to leave the country. On 7 December of that year, Zagabria was returned by the Italians to the Yugoslav Royal Navy-in-exile, and resumed the name Beli Orao. Soon after her return she was visited at Malta by Peter II, the King of Yugoslavia, who was living in exile in the UK with his government.

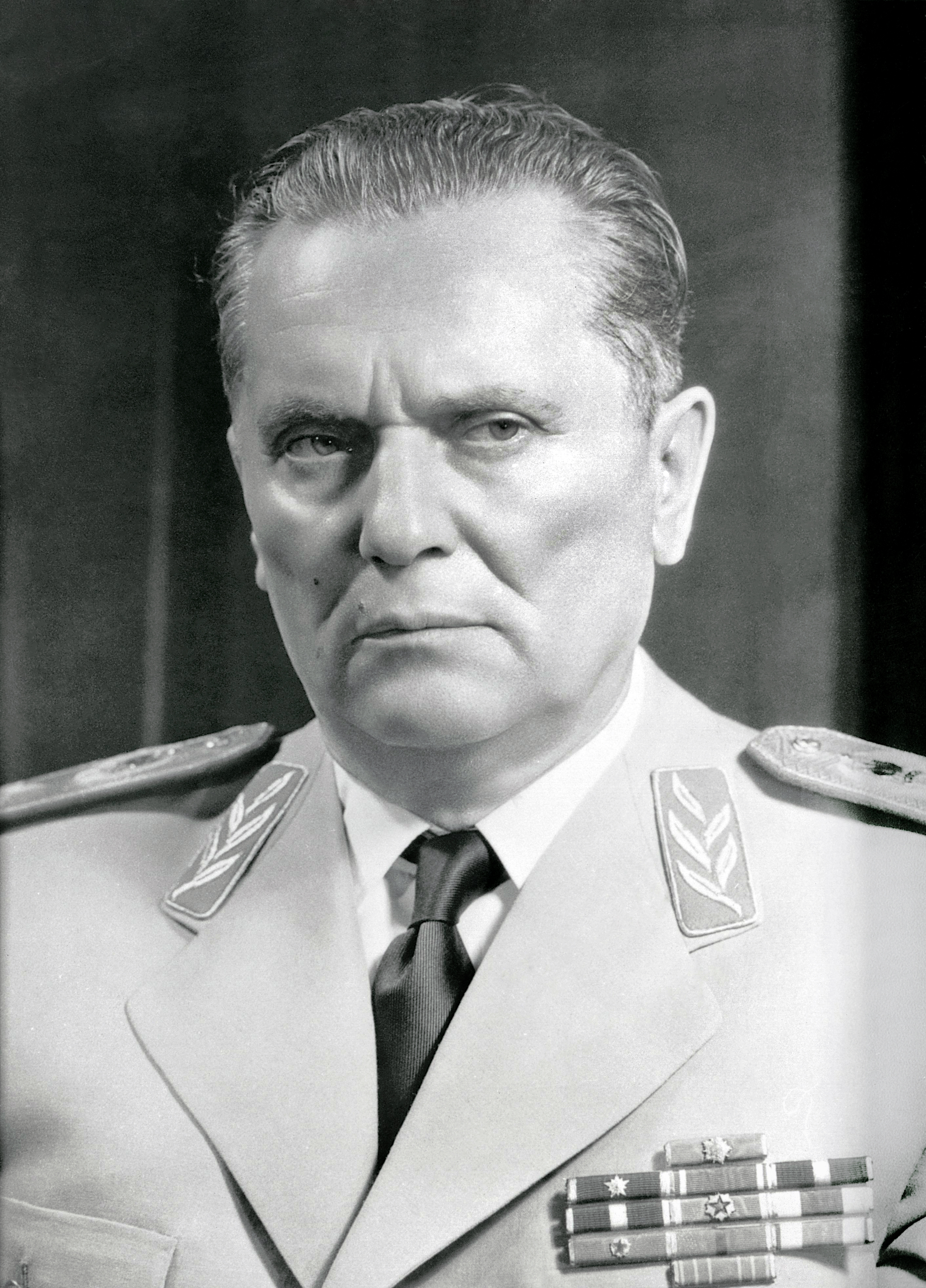
The ship was used as a presidential yacht by Josip Broz Tito after World War II.

After refitting in Taranto, Beli Orao was used as a tender for a flotilla of motor gunboats (MGBs) that had been loaned to the Yugoslav Royal Navy-in-exile by the British Royal Navy. In 1944 and 1945, she was stationed at Malta where the British Royal Navy purged the remaining "royalists" from the flotilla, replacing those personnel with politically reliable crew loyal to the Yugoslav Communist Party-led Yugoslav Partisans. The flotilla was then based at Livorno on the western coast of Italy, while it operated in the Tyrrhenian Sea. The flotilla conducted operations in the Adriatic late in the war, under Commander Konstantin Jeremić, based at Ancona on the eastern coast of Italy from 1 April 1945. In mid-April, four MGBs from the flotilla supported the capture of the island of Rab by Partisan troops, but distrust remained between the homegrown Partisan Navy and the remnants of the Yugoslav Royal Navy-in-exile, and even the British apparently limited the information they would share with the flotilla. Beli Orao continued in service until the end of the war. In the post-war communist era, Yugoslav historians criticised or ignored the operations of the flotilla, and little historical research has been conducted on the subject.

After the war she was renamed Biokovo, and in 1949 she was renamed Jadranka, serving as an armed yacht in the Yugoslav Navy and also as a presidential yacht for the President of Yugoslavia, Josip Broz Tito. In 1969 she was serving as a dispatch boat, and was deleted from the naval register in 1976 or 1977, after which a new Jadranka was built as a presidential yacht. In 1978, the original Jadranka was still in service as a yacht, but was scrapped soon after. Her ship's bell, wheel and the Yugoslav coat of arms she carried during her service are preserved at the Croatian Maritime Museum in Split.

== Sources ==
- Blackman, Raymond V. B. (1969). Jane's Fighting Ships 1969/70. London: Sampson Low, Marston and Company. ISBN 978-0-354-00050-5.
- Brescia, Maurizio (2012). Mussolini's Navy. Barnsley: Seaforth Publishing. ISBN 978-1-59114-544-8.
- Chesneau, Roger, ed. (1980). Conway's All the World's Fighting Ships 1922–1946. London: Conway Maritime Press. ISBN 978-0-85177-146-5.
- Freivogel, Zvonimir (2020). Warships of the Royal Yugoslav Navy 1918-1945. Zagreb: Despot Infinitus. ISBN 978-953-8218-72-9.
- Freivogel, Zvonimir & Rastelli, Achille (2015). Adriatic Naval War 1940-1945. Zagreb: Despot Infinitus. ISBN 978-953-7892-44-9.
- Haworth, R.B. (2016). "Bjeli Orao". Miramar Ship Index. R.B. Haworth. 6110710.
- Jane's Information Group (1989) [1946/47]. Jane's Fighting Ships of World War II. London: Studio Editions. ISBN 978-1-85170-194-0.
- Karađorđević, Petar (1954). A King's Heritage. New York: Van Rees Press. LCCN 54-10501.
- Niehorster, Leo (2017). "Balkan Operations Order of Battle Royal Yugoslavian Navy 6th April 1941". Archived from the original on 2 April 2015.
