= Aleksandar Berić =

Yugoslav naval commander

- Александар Берић
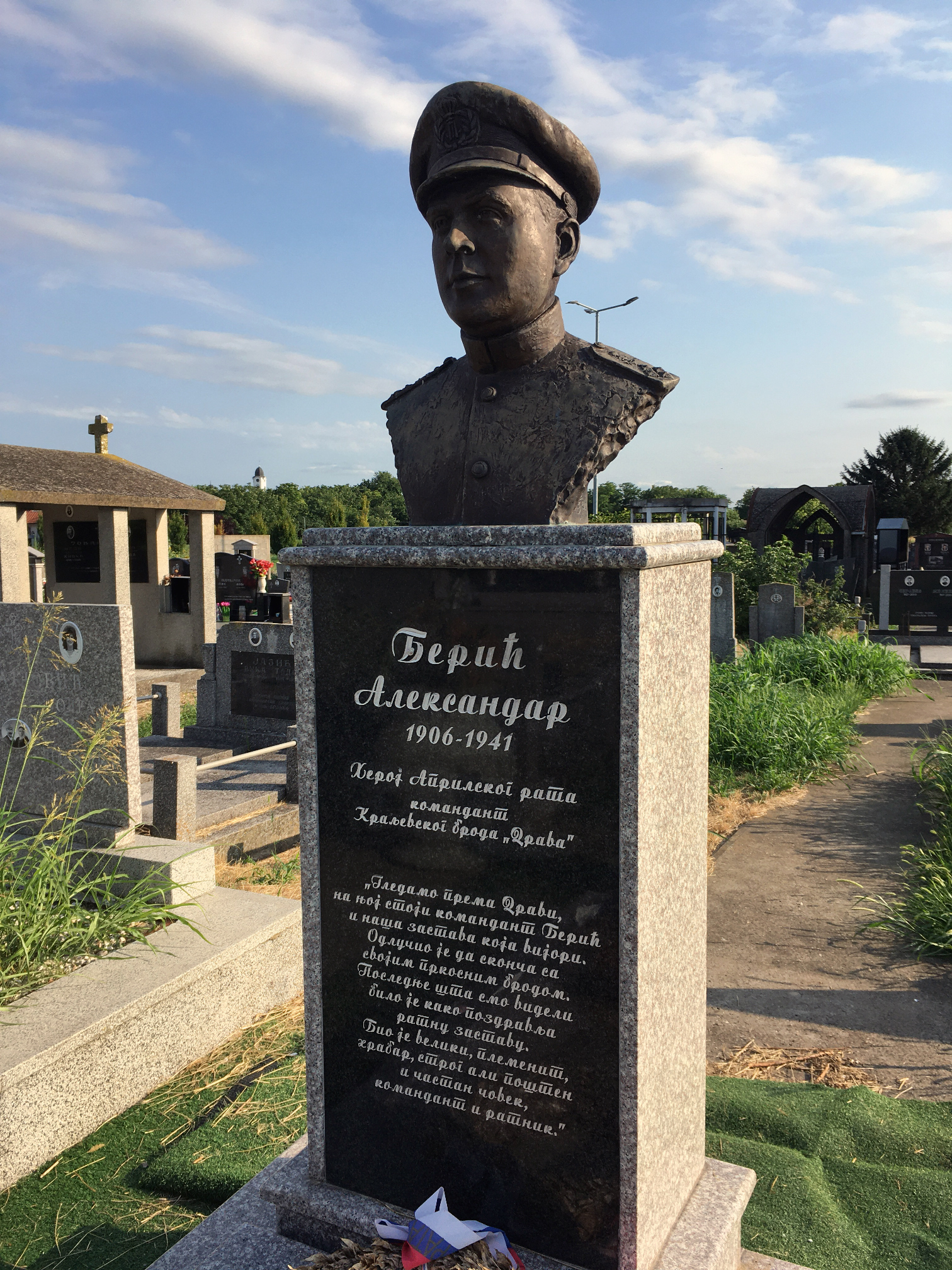
- A bust of Berić in Belegiš
- Born: 13 June 1906; Novi Bečej, Austria-Hungary
- Died: 12 April 1941 (aged 34); Belegiš, Kingdom of Yugoslavia
- Military career
- Allegiance: Kingdom of Yugoslavia
- Branch: Royal Yugoslav Navy
- Service years: 1929–1941
- Rank: Lieutenant of a battleship
- Commands: Malinska ( minelayer ) Drava ( monitor )
- Conflicts: World War II: Invasion of Yugoslavia †
- Awards

Aleksandar Berić (Serbo-Croatian Cyrillic: Александар Берић; 13 June 1906 – 12 April 1941) was a Yugoslav naval officer who died in a battle during the Axis invasion of Yugoslavia in April 1941.

During the 1930s, Berić served in various capacities aboard several Royal Yugoslav Navy vessels. In December 1940, he was appointed as the captain of the river monitor Drava. On 6 and 8 April 1941, during the Axis invasion of his country, he ordered the shelling of an airfield near the Hungarian city of Mohács. Several days later, Drava engaged four Hungarian patrol boats coming down the Danube from the direction of Mohács and managed to drive them back. Although initially imbued with a high level of morale, as the monitor's crew members became aware of the Royal Yugoslav Army's poor performance in the face of the invasion, several deserted. On 12 April, Berić oversaw the downing of three Luftwaffe Junkers Ju 87 Stuka dive bombers by his anti-aircraft gunners. Drava was eventually overwhelmed by the dive bombers, one of which scored a direct hit against her engine room. The ensuing explosion resulted in Drava's destruction, killing most of her crew. Berić did not survive the monitor's sinking.

In 1942, Berić was posthumously awarded the Order of Karađorđe's Star with Swords, 4th Class by the Yugoslav government-in-exile. In 2002, he was posthumously awarded the Medal of Honour of the Federal Republic of Yugoslavia. A memorial bust of Berić was unveiled in the village of Belegiš, near Stara Pazova, in April 2015. The headquarters of the Serbian River Flotilla in Novi Sad is also named after him.

== Biography ==
Aleksandar Berić was born in Novi Bečej, Austria-Hungary on 13 June 1906. His father Ivan was originally from Bečej and his mother Draga, who died at a young age, was originally from Subotica (both of which are located in modern-day Serbia). Berić attended the University of Zagreb for a time, but eventually dropped out with the goal of becoming a sailor. He subsequently enrolled in the Military Naval Academy in Dubrovnik, from which he graduated in 1929. Berić served in various capacities aboard the Royal Yugoslav Navy vessels Sokol, Uskok, Dalmacija, Torpiljar 1 and Četnik. He later briefly served as the captain of the minelayer Malinska. On 12 December 1940, Berić was appointed as the captain of the river monitor Drava. Bruno Šegvić, whom Berić had known from his days as a student at the University of Zagreb, was appointed as his first officer.

Drava was based at Bezdan when the German-led Axis invasion of Yugoslavia commenced on 6 April 1941, serving as the flagship of the 1st Mine Barrage Division. She was responsible for the Hungarian border on the Danube, under the operational control of the 30th Infantry Division Osiječka, which was part of the 2nd Army. At the time, the Yugoslav river flotilla consisted of four early twentieth-century river monitors which Yugoslavia had received from Austria-Hungary following World War I – Sava, Morava, Vardar and Drava. The river flotilla's commander, Edgar Angeli, was an Axis spy. He was later appointed as the commander of the Navy of the Independent State of Croatia.

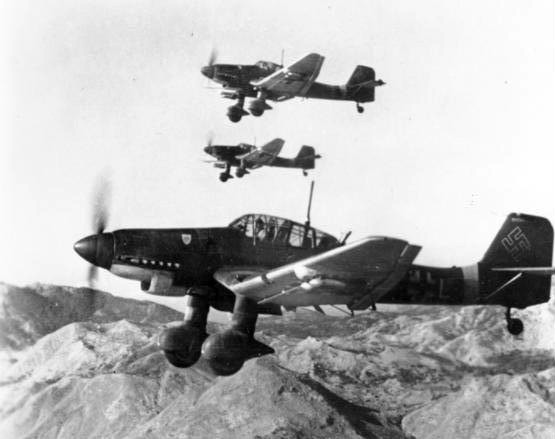
Ju 87 Stuka dive bombers of Sturzkampfgeschwader 77 sank Drava near Čib on the morning of 12 April 1941

After the invasion began, Drava steamed upstream to Mohács in Hungary to shell the airfield there on 6 and 8 April, but was subjected to daily attacks by the Luftwaffe. On 10 April, Drava and Morava were ordered to sail downstream to conform with the withdrawals of the 1st and 2nd Army's from Bačka and Baranja. Around 2:00 p.m. the following day, a Yugoslav lookout near Batina signaled Drava that four Hungarian patrol boats, armed with 70 mm (2.8 in) guns, were coming down the Danube from the direction of Mohács. Drava engaged the patrol boats at a range of 6–7 km (3.7–4.3 mi), and drove the small Hungarian flotilla north again. At 4:00 p.m., Berić once again ordered the shelling of the airfield at Mohács. Morale on the ship was good, but when Berić met with Royal Yugoslav Army elements later that day, he became aware of the situation elsewhere, and nine crew members deserted.

Around 3:00 a.m. on the morning of 12 April, Drava encountered the ruined railway bridge at Bogojevo, which prevented it from navigating further along the Danube, and anchored nearby. By 5:00 a.m., the obstruction had been cleared, and Drava continued sailing. While Drava had been anchored, seven crew members deserted their posts, commandeered the ship's motorboat and headed for Erdut. At 7:30 a.m., Drava came under attack from nine Luftwaffe Junkers Ju 87 Stuka dive bombers of Sturzkampfgeschwader 77 flying from Arad, Romania. According to the historian Velimir Terzić and the naval author Zvonimir Freivogel, Drava's anti-aircraft gunners managed to shoot down three of the incoming aircraft, but the aviation authors Christopher F. Shores, Brian Cull and Nicola Malizia state that the gunners "claimed" they had shot down three. The monitor's anti-aircraft gunners were unable to overcome a second and third wave of attacks. According to two accounts, five or six bombs struck Drava, largely destroying the ship and killing most of her crew. In contrast, Shores, Cull and Malizia write that the direct hits the Stukas managed to score on the monitor had little effect. Both sources agree that a final bomb fell directly down her funnel and exploded in her engine room. However, Miroslav Šurdilović, one of rare survivors from "Drava" remembers that the last fatal bomb fell in the space between the commanding bridge and the forward/front twin 120 mm gun turret dome ( in his filmed interview during 1970's).

According to Terzić, around 7:45 a.m., as a result of the damage inflicted on her engine room, Drava sank off Čib (modern-day Čelarevo) with the loss of 54 of her 67 crew, including her first and second officers. Freivogel agrees with the casualties specified by Terzić, and Shores, Cull and Malizia agree that there were 13 survivors, but state that 55 were killed. Terzić breaks down the survivors into seven non-commissioned officers and six sailors. Berić was killed in the sinking, having ordered the burning of codes before she sank. Two of his successful anti-aircraft gunners, Rade Milojević and Miroslav Šurdilović, survived. The exact circumstances of Berić's death are disputed. Freivogel states that Berić was killed in the sinking. According to Terzić, citing the author Anton Simović, Berić survived the sinking and managed to make his way to shore, but was then likely killed by fifth columnists. Regardless of the means of his death, his remains were subsequently identified by the local inhabitants and buried at a cemetery in the village of Belegiš, near Stara Pazova.

== Legacy ==
During its occupation of parts of Yugoslavia, Drava was raised and then scrapped by Hungary. In 1942, Berić was posthumously awarded the Order of Karađorđe's Star with Swords, 4th Class by the Yugoslav government-in-exile. In 2002, he was posthumously awarded the Medal of Honour of the Federal Republic of Yugoslavia. A memorial bust of Berić was unveiled by Serbian Defence Minister Bratislav Gašić in Belegiš on 6 April 2015. The headquarters of the Serbian River Flotilla in Novi Sad is also named after him.

== See also ==
- Milan Spasić
- Sergej Mašera
