= Skoda 14 cm/56 naval gun =

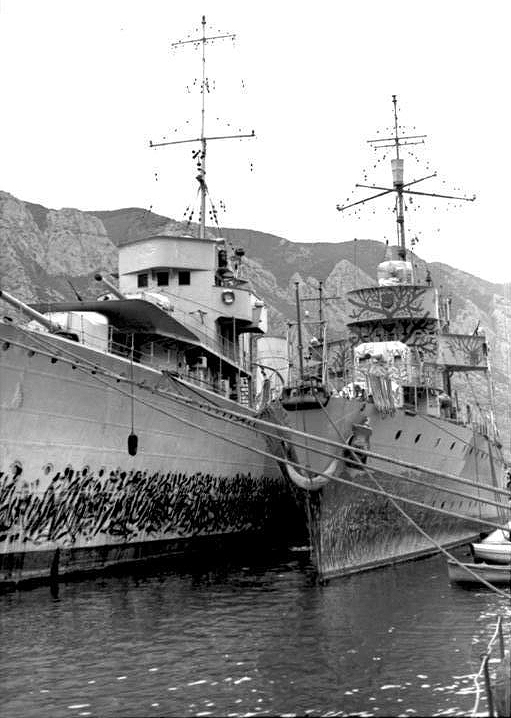
- Skoda 14 cm guns aboard the captured Yugoslav destroyer Dubrovnik (left), 17 April 1941
- Type: Naval gun
- Place of origin: Czechoslovakia

Service history
- In service: 1932–45
- Used by: Royal Yugoslav Navy; Regia Marina; Kriegsmarine
- Wars: World War II

Specifications
- Mass: 6,000 kilograms (13,228 lb)
- Barrel length: About 7.84 meters (25 ft 9 in) (bore length)
- Shell: Separate-loading, brass case
- Shell weight: 39.8 kilograms (88 lb)
- Caliber: 14 centimeters (5.5 in)
- Rate of fire: 5–6 rounds per minute
- Muzzle velocity: 880 meters per second (2,900 ft/s)
- Maximum firing range: 23,400 meters (25,600 yd)

The Skoda 14 cm/56 naval gun was built by the Škoda Works for export during the 1930s. The few guns built were sold to Yugoslavia to equip their large destroyers. A class of three flotilla leaders was intended to be built but only Dubrovnik was completed. After the conquest of Yugoslavia in April 1941, the ship was taken over by the Royal Italian Navy (Regia Marina) where it was renamed Premuda. After the Italian surrender the Premuda was classified as a Torpedoboot Ausland and given the designation TA32 by the Kriegsmarine.

== Bibliography ==
- Campbell, John (1985). Naval Weapons of World War II. Annapolis, Maryland: Naval Institute Press. ISBN 0-87021-459-4.
