= Yugoslav destroyer Zagreb =

First warship built in the Kingdom of Yugoslavia

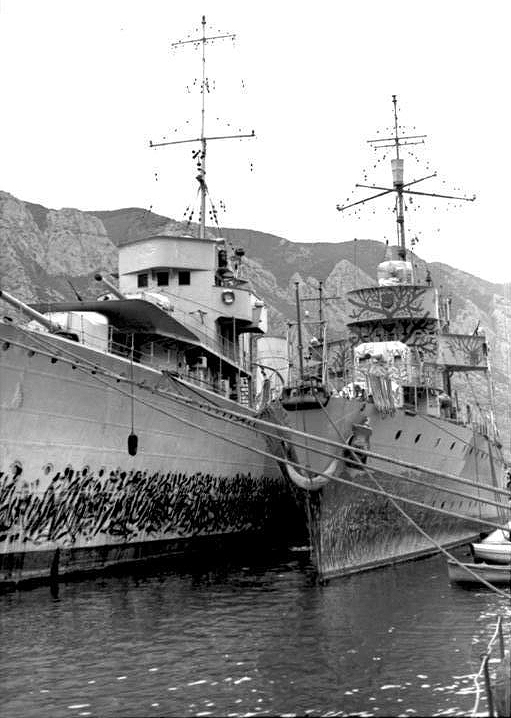
- Zagreb's sister ship Beograd (right) and Dubrovnik (left) in the Bay of Kotor after being captured by Italy

History

Kingdom of Yugoslavia
- Name: Zagreb
- Namesake: Zagreb
- Launched: 30 March 1938
- Commissioned: August 1939
- Out of service: 17 April 1941
- Fate: Scuttled by crew on 17 April 1941

General characteristics
- Class & type: Beograd-class destroyer
- Displacement: 1,210 tonnes (1,190 long tons) (standard); 1,655 tonnes (1,629 long tons) (full load)
- Length: 98 m (321 ft 6 in)
- Beam: 9.45 m (31 ft)
- Draught: 3.18 m (10 ft 5 in)
- Installed power: 3 × Yarrow water-tube boilers; 40,000–44,000 shp (30,000–33,000 kW)
- Propulsion: 2 × shafts; Parsons steam turbines
- Speed: 35 knots (65 km/h; 40 mph)
- Complement: 145
- Armament: 4 × single 120 mm (4.7 in) guns; 2 × dual 40 mm (1.6 in) AA guns; 2 × triple 550 mm (22 in) torpedo tubes; 2 × machine guns; 30 naval mines

Zagreb was the second of three Beograd-class destroyers built for the Royal Yugoslav Navy (KM) in the late 1930s. She was designed to be deployed as part of a division led by the flotilla leader Dubrovnik and was the first warship built in the Kingdom of Yugoslavia. Zagreb entered service in August 1939, was armed with a main battery of four 120 mm (4.7 in) guns in single mounts, and had a top speed of 35 knots (65 km/h; 40 mph).

Yugoslavia entered World War II when the German-led Axis powers invaded in April 1941. On 17 April, Zagreb was scuttled by two of her officers at the Bay of Kotor to prevent her capture by approaching Italian forces. Both officers were killed by the explosion of the scuttling charges. A 1967 French film, Flammes sur l'Adriatique (Adriatic Sea of Fire), told the story of her demise and the deaths of the two officers. In 1973, on the thirtieth anniversary of the formation of the Yugoslav Navy, both men were posthumously awarded the Order of the People's Hero by President Josip Broz Tito.

== Background ==
In the early 1930s, the Royal Yugoslav Navy (Serbo-Croatian: Kraljevska mornarica; Serbo-Croatian Cyrillic: Краљевска морнарица; КМ) pursued the flotilla leader concept, which involved building large destroyers similar to the World War I British Royal Navy V and W-class destroyers. In the interwar French Navy, flotilla leaders were intended to operate as half-flotillas of three ships, or with one flotilla leader operating alongside several smaller destroyers. The KM decided to build three such flotilla leaders, ships that could reach high speeds and would have long endurance. The endurance requirement reflected Yugoslav plans to deploy the ships to the central Mediterranean, where they would be able to cooperate with French and British warships. This resulted in the construction of the destroyer Dubrovnik in 1930–1931. Soon after she was ordered, the onset of the Great Depression and attendant economic pressures meant that only one ship of the planned half-flotilla was ever built. British diplomatic staff reported that although three large destroyers were not going to be built, the intent that Dubrovnik might operate with several smaller destroyers persisted. In 1934, the KM decided to acquire three smaller destroyers to operate in a division led by Dubrovnik.

== Description and construction ==
The Beograd class was developed from a French destroyer design, and the second ship of the class, Zagreb, was built by Jadranska brodogradilišta at Split, Yugoslavia, under French supervision. The shipyard she was constructed in was jointly owned by Yarrow and Chantiers de la Loire. The ship had an overall length of 98 m (321 ft 6 in), a beam of 9.45 m (31 ft), and a normal draught of 3.18 m (10 ft 5 in). Her standard displacement was 1,210 tonnes (1,190 long tons), and she displaced 1,655 tonnes (1,629 long tons) at full load. The crew consisted of 145 officers and enlisted men. The ship was powered by Parsons geared steam turbines driving two propellers, using steam generated by three Yarrow water-tube boilers. Her turbines were rated between 40,000–44,000 shaft horsepower (30,000–33,000 kW) and she was designed to reach a top speed of 38–39 knots (70–72 km/h; 44–45 mph), although she was only able to reach a practical top speed of 35 knots (65 km/h; 40 mph) in service. She carried 120 t (120 long tons) of fuel oil. Although data is not available for Zagreb, her sister ship Beograd had a range of 1,000 nautical miles (1,900 km; 1,200 mi).

Her main armament consisted of four Škoda 120 mm (4.7 in) L/46 (Note: L/46 denotes the length of the gun. In this case, the L/46 gun is 46 calibre, meaning that the gun was 46 times as long as the diameter of its bore.) superfiring guns in single mounts, two forward of the superstructure, and two aft, protected by gun shields. Her secondary armament consisted of four Škoda 40 mm (1.6 in) anti-aircraft guns in two twin mounts, located on either side of the aft shelter deck. She was also equipped with two triple mounts of 550 mm (22 in) torpedo tubes and two machine guns. Her fire-control system was provided by the Dutch firm Hazemeyer. As-built, she could also carry 30 naval mines.

She was laid down in 1936, and launched on 30 March 1938. Zagreb was the first warship to be built in Yugoslavia. Her launching ceremony was overseen by the wife of the Minister of Army and Navy and a public holiday was declared to mark the occasion. The destroyer was commissioned into the KM in August 1939.

== Career ==
At the time of the German-led Axis invasion of Yugoslavia in April 1941, Zagreb and Beograd were allocated to the 1st Torpedo Division headquartered at the Bay of Kotor. From the outbreak of war on 6 April, there were Axis air attacks on the ships and shore installations in the Bay of Kotor, but despite near misses, Zagreb was not hit by any bombs. During the days following the invasion, Zagreb and other ships were moved to different locations within the bay and camouflaged. On 16 April, the ship's crew was informed of the imminent surrender of the Yugoslav armed forces and ordered not to resist the enemy any further. A large proportion of the crew left the ship upon receiving this news. The following day, with Italian forces closing on the Bay of Kotor, two junior officers, Milan Spasić and Sergej Mašera, forced the captain and remaining crew from the ship and set scuttling charges to prevent her capture. Both officers were killed in the explosions. Most of the ship sank, while the portions that remained on the surface burned over the following days. Spasić's remains washed ashore on 21 April and were given a full military funeral by Italian forces on 5 May. Mašera's severed head also washed up and was secretly buried by locals.

The destruction of Zagreb was portrayed in the 1967 French film Flammes sur l'Adriatique (Adriatic Sea of Fire), which was directed by Alexandre Astruc, and starred Gérard Barray. The film was partly filmed on location in Yugoslavia and was released in France in 1968. In 1973, on the thirtieth anniversary of the establishment of the Yugoslav Navy, the President of Yugoslavia and wartime Partisan leader Josip Broz Tito posthumously awarded both officers the Order of the People's Hero for their courage. In the mid-1980s, Mašera's head was disinterred and forensically identified, after which it was buried at a cemetery in Ljubljana (in modern-day Slovenia). A portion of Zagreb's bow is kept on display at the Maritime Museum of Montenegro in Kotor.
