= Yugoslav destroyer Dubrovnik =

Yugoslav ship built in 1930–31

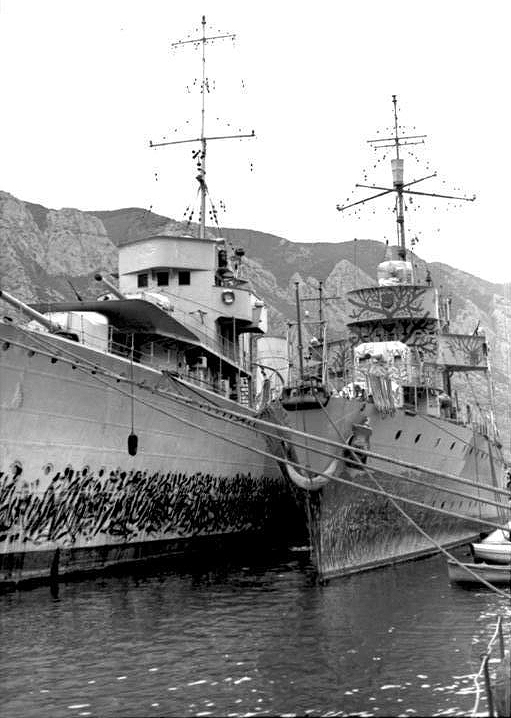
- Dubrovnik (left) and Beograd (right) photographed in the Bay of Kotor in 1941 after being captured by Italian forces.

History

Yugoslavia
- Name: Dubrovnik
- Namesake: City of Dubrovnik
- Ordered: 1929
- Builder: Yarrow Shipbuilders
- Laid down: 10 June 1930
- Launched: 11 October 1931
- Sponsored by: Princess Olga
- Commissioned: May 1932
- Fate: Captured by Italian forces on 17 April 1941

Italy
- Name: Premuda
- Namesake: The island of Premuda
- Acquired: 17 April 1941
- Commissioned: February 1942
- Fate: Captured by German forces on 9 September 1943

Germany
- Name: TA32
- Acquired: 9 September 1943
- Commissioned: 18 August 1944
- Fate: Scuttled on 24 April 1945

General characteristics
- Type: Flotilla leader
- Displacement: Standard: 1,880 long tons (1,910 t); Full: 2,400 long tons (2,439 t)
- Length: 113.2 m (371 ft 5 in)
- Beam: 10.67 m (35 ft 0 in)
- Draught: 3.58–4.1 m (11 ft 9 in – 13 ft 5 in)
- Propulsion: Two shafts; 2 × Parsons steam turbines (48,000 shp (36,000 kW)); 1 × Curtis steam turbine for cruising (900 shp (670 kW)); 3 × Yarrow water-tube boilers
- Speed: Maximum: 37 knots (69 km/h; 43 mph); Cruising: 15 knots (28 km/h; 17 mph)
- Range: 7,000 nmi (13,000 km; 8,100 mi) at 15 knots (28 km/h; 17 mph)
- Complement: 20 officers and 220 enlisted
- Armament: 4 × Škoda 140 mm (5.5 in) naval guns; 2 × Škoda 83.5 mm (3.29 in) AA guns; 6 × Škoda 40 mm (1.6 in) AA guns; 2 × Česká zbrojovka 15 mm (0.59 in) machine guns; 6 × 533 mm (21 in) torpedo tubes; 40 × naval mines

Dubrovnik was a flotilla leader built for the Royal Yugoslav Navy by Yarrow Shipbuilders in Glasgow in 1930 and 1931. She was one of the largest destroyers of her time. Resembling contemporary British designs, Dubrovnik was a fast ship with a main armament of four Czechoslovak-built Škoda 140 mm (5.5 in) guns in single mounts. She was intended to be the first of three flotilla leaders built for Yugoslavia, but was the only one completed. During her service with the Royal Yugoslav Navy, Dubrovnik undertook several peacetime cruises through the Mediterranean, the Turkish Straits and the Black Sea. In October 1934, she conveyed King Alexander to France for a state visit, and carried his body back to Yugoslavia following his assassination in Marseille.

During the German-led Axis invasion of Yugoslavia in April 1941, Dubrovnik was captured by the Italians. After a refit, which included the replacement of some of her weapons and the shortening of her mainmast and funnels, she was commissioned into the Royal Italian Navy as Premuda. In Italian service she was mainly used as an escort and troop transport. In June 1942, she was part of the Italian force that attacked the Allied Operation Harpoon convoy attempting to relieve the island of Malta. In July 1943, she broke down and was brought to Genoa for repair and a refit. Premuda was the most important and effective Italian war prize ship of World War II.

At the time of the Italian surrender to the Allies in September 1943, Premuda was still docked in Genoa, and was seized by Germany. Plans to convert her into a radar picket for night fighters were abandoned. In August 1944, following the replacement of her armament, she was commissioned into the German Navy as a Torpedoboot Ausland (foreign torpedo boat) with the designation TA32. The ship saw action shelling Allied positions on the Italian coast and laying naval mines. In March 1945, she took part in the Battle of the Ligurian Sea against two Royal Navy destroyers, during which she was lightly damaged. She was scuttled the following month as the Germans retreated from Genoa.

== Development ==
Following the demise of the Austro-Hungarian Empire and the subsequent creation of the Kingdom of Serbs, Croats and Slovenes (KSCS), Austria-Hungary transferred the vessels of the former Austro-Hungarian Navy to the new nation. The Kingdom of Italy was unhappy with this, and convinced the Allies to share the Austro-Hungarian ships among the victorious powers. As a result, the only modern sea-going vessels left to the KSCS were 12 torpedo boats, and they had to build their naval forces almost from scratch.

During the 1920s, many navies were pursuing the flotilla leader concept, building large destroyers similar to the World War I Royal Navy V and W-class destroyers. In the interwar French Navy, these ships were known as contre-torpilleurs, and were intended to operate with smaller destroyers, or as half-flotillas of three ships. The idea was that such a half-flotilla could defeat an Italian light cruiser of the Condottieri class. The Navy of the KSCS decided to build three such flotilla leaders, ships that would have the ability to reach high speeds and with a long endurance. The long endurance requirement reflected Yugoslav plans to deploy the ships into the central Mediterranean, where they would be able to operate alongside French and British warships.

At the time the decision was made, French shipyards were heavily committed to producing vessels for the French Navy. So, despite its intention to develop a French concept, the KSCS engaged Yarrow Shipbuilders in Glasgow, Scotland, to build the ships. Unlike the French, who preferred to install guns of their own manufacture, Yarrow was happy to order the guns from the Czechoslovak firm Škoda. The initial Yarrow design was based on an enlarged version of the British Shakespeare class, with five Skoda 14 cm/56 naval guns. Excessive top weight resulted in the deletion of one of the guns, to be replaced with a seaplane mounting. The final version replaced the seaplane mounting with improved anti-aircraft armament.

The intention to build three flotilla leaders was demonstrated by the fact that Yarrow ordered a total of 12 Škoda 140 mm (5.5 in) guns, four per ship. In July or August 1929, the KSCS (which became the Kingdom of Yugoslavia on 3 October) signed a contract with Yarrow for a destroyer named Dubrovnik. This was the only ship built; the Great Depression prevented the construction of the rest of the planned half-flotilla.

== Description and construction ==
Dubrovnik was similar in many respects to the British destroyers being manufactured at the same time, having a square box-like bridge, a long forecastle, and a sharp raked stem similar to the later British Tribal class. Her rounded stern was adapted for minelaying. She had an overall length of 113.2 metres (371 ft 5 in), with a 10.67 m (35 ft) beam, a mean draught of 3.58 m (11 ft 9 in), and a maximum draught of 4.1 m (13 ft 5 in). Her standard displacement was 1,880 long tons (1,910 t), and 2,400 long tons (2,439 t) at full load.

Dubrovnik had two Parsons geared steam turbines, each driving a single propeller shaft. Steam for the turbines was provided by three Yarrow water-tube boilers, located in separate boiler rooms, and the turbines were rated at 48,000 shp (36,000 kW). As designed, the ship had a maximum speed of 37 knots (69 km/h; 43 mph). In 1934, under ideal conditions, she achieved a maximum speed of 40.3 knots (74.6 km/h; 46.4 mph). A separate Curtis turbine, rated at 900 shp (670 kW), was installed for cruising, with which she could achieve a range of 7,000 nautical miles (13,000 km; 8,100 mi) at 15 knots (28 km/h; 17 mph). She carried 470 tonnes (460 long tons) of fuel oil.

The ship's main armament consisted of four Škoda 140 mm (5.5 in) L/56 (Note: L/56 denotes the length of the gun. In this case, the L/56 gun is 56 calibre, meaning that the gun was 56 times as long as the diameter of its bore.) superfiring guns in single mounts, two forward of the superstructure and two aft. She was also equipped with two triple Brotherhoods 533 mm (21 in) torpedo tubes on her centreline. For air defence, Dubrovnik had twin-mounted Škoda 83.5 mm (3.29 in) L/35 guns located on the centreline between the two sets of torpedo tubes, and six semi-automatic Škoda 40 mm (1.6 in) L/67 anti-aircraft guns, arranged in two twin mounts and two single mounts. The twin mounts were located between the two funnels, with the single mounts on the main deck abreast the aft control station. For anti-submarine work she was equipped with two depth charge throwers and two depth charge rails, and carried ten depth charges. She also carried two Česká zbrojovka 15 mm (0.59 in) machine guns and 40 mines. Her crew comprised 20 officers and 220 ratings. She was laid down on 10 June 1930 and launched on 11 October 1931 by Princess Olga, the consort of the Prince Regent of Yugoslavia, Prince Paul. She was named after the former city-state and Yugoslav port of Dubrovnik.

== Service history ==
=== Dubrovnik ===
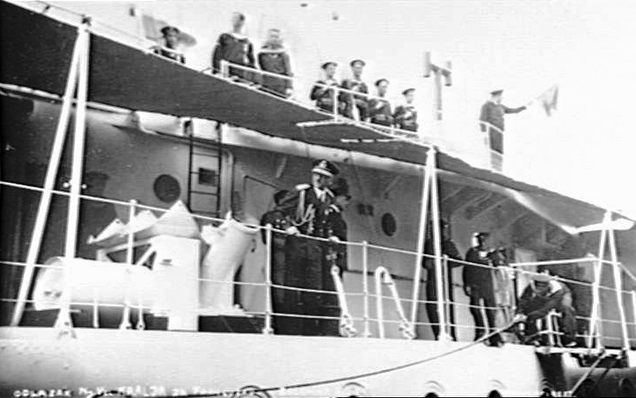
King Alexander on board Dubrovnik in October 1934 before his voyage to France.

Dubrovnik was completed at the Yarrow shipyards in Glasgow in 1932, by which time her main guns and light anti-aircraft guns had been installed. After sailing to the Bay of Kotor in the southern Adriatic, she was fitted with her heavy anti-aircraft guns. She was commissioned with the Royal Yugoslav Navy in May 1932. Her captain was Armin Pavić.

In late September 1933, the ship left the Bay of Kotor and sailed through the Turkish Straits to Constanța on the Black Sea coast of Bulgaria, where she embarked King Alexander and Queen Maria of Yugoslavia. She then visited Balcic in Romania and Varna in Bulgaria, before returning via Istanbul and the Greek island of Corfu in the Ionian Sea, arriving back at the Bay of Kotor on 8 October. On 6 October 1934, King Alexander left the Bay of Kotor on board Dubrovnik for a state visit to France, arriving in Marseille on 9 October. He was killed the same day by a Bulgarian assassin, and Dubrovnik conveyed his body back to Yugoslavia, escorted by French, Italian and British ships. Soon after, Vladimir Šaškijević replaced Pavić as captain. In August 1935, Dubrovnik visited Corfu and Bizerte in the French protectorate of Tunisia. In August 1937, Dubrovnik visited Istanbul and the Greek ports of Mudros in the northern Aegean Sea and Piraeus near Athens.

Despite trying to remain neutral in the early stages of the World War II, Yugoslavia was drawn into the conflict in April 1941, when it was invaded by the German-led Axis powers. At the time, Dubrovnik was still under Šaškijević's command and was assigned as the flagship of the 1st Torpedo Division, along with the smaller Beograd-class destroyers, Beograd and Zagreb. On 6 April, the date the invasion began, Dubrovnik was in the Bay of Kotor.

=== Premuda ===
The Italians captured Dubrovnik in the Bay of Kotor on 17 April 1941; she had been damaged by Yugoslav civilians prior to her seizure. Dubrovnik was sailed to Taranto in southern Italy on 21 May, where she underwent repairs and a refit. She was renamed Premuda, after the Dalmatian island near which an Italian motor torpedo boat had sunk the Austro-Hungarian dreadnought Szent István in June 1918. Her aft deckhouse and emergency bridge were removed and replaced with an anti-aircraft platform, and her mainmast and funnels were shortened. Her four single mount Škoda 140 mm (5.5 in) L/56 guns were replaced by four single mount 135 mm L/45 guns and her twin Škoda 83.5 mm (3.29 in) L/55 anti-aircraft guns were replaced by a 120 mm (4.7 in) L/15 howitzer firing star shells for illumination, while the six Škoda 40 mm (1.6 in) L/67 anti-aircraft guns were replaced by four Breda Model 35 20 mm (0.79 in) L/65 machine guns in single mounts, space for the latter being made available by removing her searchlights. A new director was also fitted to her bridge. Later in her Italian service, the 120 mm (4.7 in) howitzer was replaced by a twin Breda 37 mm (1.5 in) L/54 anti-aircraft gun mount. Under the Italian flag, her crew consisted of 13 officers and 191 enlisted ranks.

Premuda was commissioned in the Italian Navy (Italian: Regia Marina) in February 1942. Later that month she rescued British prisoners of war who survived the sinking of the Ariosto, an Italian cargo ship ferrying them from Tripoli to Sicily. In early June, the Italian submarine Alagi fired torpedoes at Premuda, mistaking her for a British destroyer owing to her similarities with a British H-class destroyer. The attack missed Premuda and struck the Navigatori-class destroyer Antoniotto Usodimare, sinking her. During 12–16 June 1942, Premuda took part in operations against the Allied Operation Harpoon convoy attempting to reach the beleaguered island of Malta from Gibraltar. As part of the 10th Destroyer Flotilla, Premuda supported the Italian 7th Cruiser Squadron, comprising the light cruisers Eugenio di Savoia and Raimondo Montecuccoli. The Allied naval force lost two destroyers and four merchant ships to a combination of naval gunfire, torpedoes, air attacks, and naval mines. The Navigatori-class destroyer Ugolino Vivaldi was hit by a British destroyer, and Premuda was tasked to tow her to safety in the harbour of Pantelleria, an island in the Strait of Sicily, under escort from the destroyer Lanzerotto Malocello.

On 6–7 January 1943, Premuda and 13 other Italian destroyers transported troops to the Axis-held port of Tunis in North Africa. They completed two more such missions between 9 February and 22 March. On 17 July, Premuda developed serious engine problems in the Ligurian Sea near La Spezia. She was subsequently brought to Genoa for a major boiler and engine overhaul. It was decided to rebuild her along the lines of the Navigatori-class, including a wider beam to improve her stability. As shells for her Škoda-built main guns were in short supply, the decision was made to replace them with Italian-made 135 mm (5.3 in) /L45 guns in single mounts. The rebuild was also to have included augmented 37 mm and 20 mm armament, probably using space made available by removing her aft torpedo tubes. The rebuild had not been completed when Italy surrendered to the Allies, and Premuda was seized by Germany at Genoa on 8 or 9 September 1943. Premuda was the most important and effective Italian war prize ship of World War II.

=== TA32 ===
Premuda's new guns had not been completed when she was captured by the Germans. Their initial plans called for the ship to serve as a radar picket for night fighters, with three 105 mm (4.1 in) L/45 anti-aircraft guns in single mounts, Freya early-warning radar, Würzburg gun-laying radar and a FuMO 21 surface fire-control system. These plans were soon abandoned because the Germans lacked destroyers and torpedo boats in the Mediterranean, and the decision was made to commission her as a Torpedoboot Ausland (foreign torpedo boat) with a DeTe radar instead of the Freya and Würzburg radar sets. Her armament was replaced with four 105 mm (4.1 in) L/45 naval guns, eight 37 mm (1.5 in) anti-aircraft guns and between thirty-two and thirty-six 20 mm (0.79 in) anti-aircraft guns in quadruple and twin mounts. The number of torpedo tubes was reduced from six to three. The number of 37 mm (1.5 in) anti-aircraft guns was later increased to ten, in four twin and two single mounts. In German service, she had a total crew of 220 officers and men.

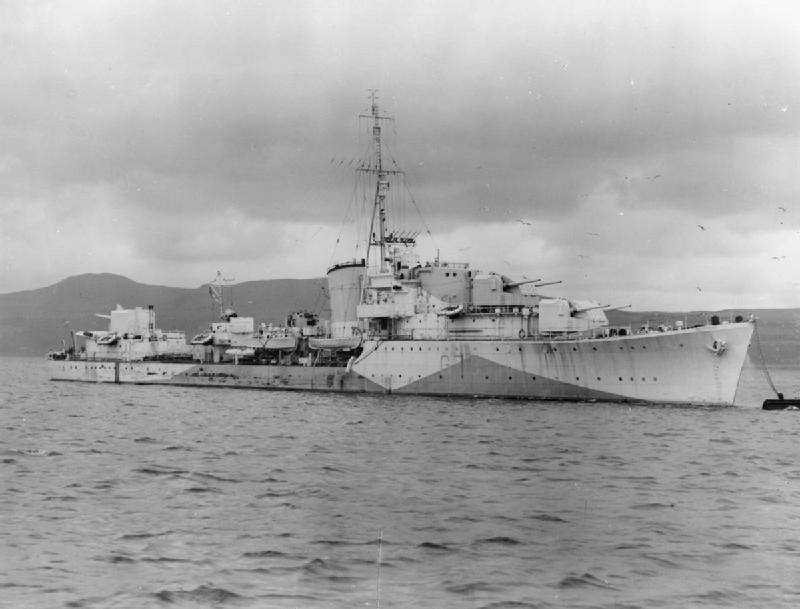
HMS Meteor (pictured) and HMS Lookout outgunned TA32 and her companions during the Battle of the Ligurian Sea in March 1945.

The ship was commissioned in the German Navy (German: Kriegsmarine) on 18 August 1944, as TA32, under the command of Kapitänleutnant Emil Kopka. She served in the Ligurian Sea with the 10th Torpedo Boat Flotilla, and was immediately committed to shelling Allied positions on the Italian coast, then scouting and minelaying tasks in the western Gulf of Genoa. On 2 October 1944, TA32, along with TA24 and TA29, sailed towards Sanremo to lay mines, where they encountered the destroyer USS Gleaves. After exchanging fire, the three ships returned to Genoa without being hit. By mid-March 1945, TA32, TA24 and TA29 were the only ships of the 10th Torpedo Boat Flotilla that remained operational. On the night of 17/18 March 1945, TA32 placed 76 naval mines off Cap Corse, the northern tip of Corsica, in an offensive minelaying operation, along with TA24 and TA29. After being detected by a shore-based radar, the ships were engaged by the destroyers HMS Lookout and HMS Meteor, in what would become known as the Battle of the Ligurian Sea. Outgunned, TA24 and TA29 were sunk, while TA32 managed to escape with light damage to her rudder, after firing a few rounds and making an abortive torpedo attack. TA32 was scuttled at Genoa on 24 April 1945 as the Germans retreated. Her wreck was raised and broken up in 1950.

== See also ==
- List of ships of the Royal Yugoslav Navy
