= 8.35 cm PL kanon vz. 22 =

- Posed shot of a PL kanon vz. 22 preparing for action
- Type: Anti-aircraft gun
- Place of origin: Czechoslovakia

Service history
- In service: 1924–1945
- Used by: See users
- Wars: World War II

Production history
- Designer: Škoda Works
- Manufacturer: Škoda Works
- Produced: 1924–37?

Specifications
- Mass: 8,800 kilograms (19,400 lb)
- Barrel length: 4.6 metres (15 ft) L/55
- Shell: 83.5 x 677mm R
- Shell weight: 10 kilograms (22 lb) (HE)
- Caliber: 83.5 millimetres (3.29 in)
- Elevation: 0° to +85°
- Traverse: 360°
- Rate of fire: 12 rpm
- Muzzle velocity: 800 metres per second (2,600 ft/s)
- Maximum firing range: 11,300 metres (37,100 ft) vertical ceiling

The 8.35 cm PL kanon vz. 22 (Anti-aircraft Gun Model 22) was a Czech anti-aircraft gun used during World War II. Those weapons captured after the German occupation of Czechoslovakia in March 1939 were taken into Wehrmacht service as the 8.35 cm Flak 22(t). Some guns were reportedly captured in Yugoslavia as well. 144 were in Czech service during the Munich Crisis in September 1938 of which Slovakia seized between twenty-five and twenty-nine when it declared independence six months later. One hundred seven were in German service in August 1943, declining to twenty by October 1944.

== Description ==
The PLK vz. 22 was mounted on a pedestal which was fixed to a circular firing platform that was mounted on a wheeled carriage. It was fired from the carriage once the side outriggers were swung into position to support the carriage. The carriage's metal wheels limited its towing speed to 12 kilometres per hour (7.5 mph).

== Users ==
- Czechoslovakia
- Nazi Germany
- Slovakia
- Yugoslavia
