= Adriatic Sea of Fire =

- Directed by: Alexandre Astruc
- Written by: Meša Selimović; Jean Curtelin; Vladimir Balvanović
- Produced by: André Génovès
- Cinematography: Miroljub Dikosavljević; Jean-Jacques Rochut
- Edited by: Marija Fuks; Jacques Gaillard
- Music by: Pierre Jansen
- Release date: 18 August 1968
- Running time: 91 minutes
- Countries: France; Yugoslavia
- Language: French

Adriatic Sea of Fire (French: Flammes sur l'Adriatique) is a 1968 French-Yugoslav war drama film directed by Alexandre Astruc. It tells the story of the Yugoslav destroyer Zagreb which fights against Italy in 1941, and how some of the crew members try to organise a mutiny to keep fighting when the commander is ordered to surrender.

== Cast ==
- Gérard Barray as Michel
- Claudine Auger as Mirjana
- Antonio Passalia as Serge
- Raoul Saint-Yves as Dr Baric
- Tatjana Beljakova as Veronica
- Relja Bašić as the captain
