= Yugoslav destroyer Beograd =

Yugoslav ship active in WWII

Beograd
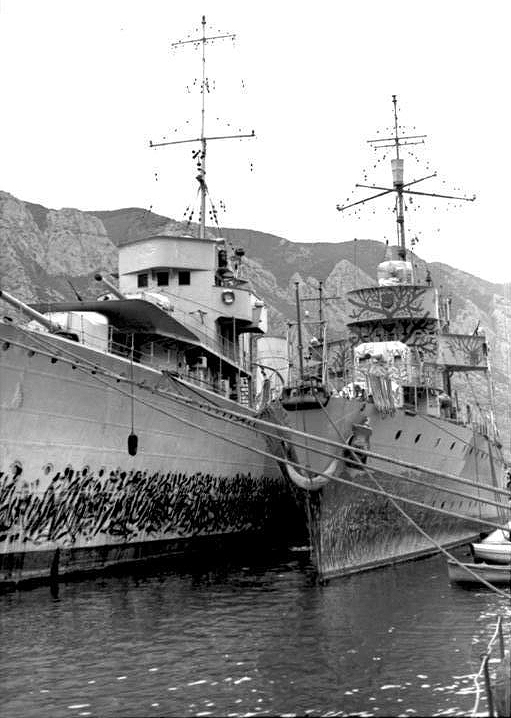
- Beograd (right) and Dubrovnik (left) in the Bay of Kotor after being captured by Italy in April 1941

History

Kingdom of Yugoslavia
- Name: Beograd
- Namesake: Belgrade
- Builder: Ateliers et Chantiers de la Loire, Nantes, France
- Launched: 23 December 1937
- Commissioned: 28 April 1939
- Out of service: 17 April 1941
- Fate: Captured by Italy

Italy
- Name: Sebenico
- Namesake: Šibenik
- Acquired: 17 April 1941
- In service: August 1941
- Out of service: 9 September 1943
- Fate: Captured by Germany at Venice

Nazi Germany
- Name: TA43
- Acquired: 9 September 1943
- Fate: Sunk or scuttled at Trieste on 30 April or 1 May 1945
- Notes: Raised in June 1946, scuttled in July 1946

General characteristics
- Class & type: Beograd-class destroyer
- Displacement: 1,210 t (1,190 long tons) (standard); 1,655 t (1,629 long tons) (full load)
- Length: 98 m (321 ft 6 in)
- Beam: 9.45 m (31 ft)
- Draught: 3.18 m (10 ft 5 in)
- Installed power: 3 × Yarrow water-tube boilers; 40,000 shp (30,000 kW)
- Propulsion: 2 × shafts; Curtis steam turbines
- Speed: 35 knots (65 km/h; 40 mph)
- Complement: 145
- Armament: 4 × single 120 mm (4.7 in) guns; 2 × twin 40 mm (1.6 in) AA guns; 2 × triple 550 mm (22 in) torpedo tubes; 2 × single machine guns; 30 naval mines

Beograd was the lead ship of her class of destroyers, built for the Royal Yugoslav Navy in France during the late 1930s, and designed to be deployed as part of a division led by the flotilla leader Dubrovnik. She entered service in April 1939, was armed with a main battery of four 120 mm (4.7 in) guns in single mounts, and had a top speed of 35 knots (65 km/h; 40 mph).

When Yugoslavia entered World War II due to a German-led Axis invasion in April 1941, she was damaged by a near miss during an air attack, and was then captured by the Italians. After refitting, she saw extensive service with the Royal Italian Navy from August 1941 to September 1943, completing over 100 convoy escort missions in the Mediterranean under the name Sebenico, mainly on routes between Italy and the Aegean and North Africa. Following the Italian armistice in September 1943, she was captured by the German Navy and redesignated TA43. They enhanced her anti-aircraft armament and she served with the 9th Torpedo Boat Flotilla on escort and minelaying duties in the northern Adriatic. TA43 was sunk or scuttled at Trieste on 30 April or 1 May 1945. Raised in June 1946, probably to remove her as a navigation hazard, she was scuttled again in either July 1946 or in 1947.

== Background ==
In the early 1930s, the Royal Yugoslav Navy (Kraljevska mornarica, or KM) pursued the flotilla leader concept, which involved building large destroyers similar to the World War I British Royal Navy V and W-class destroyers. In the interwar French Navy, these ships were intended to operate as half-flotillas of three ships, or with one flotilla leader operating alongside several smaller destroyers. The KM decided to build three such flotilla leaders, ships that could reach high speeds and would have long endurance. The endurance requirement reflected Yugoslav plans to deploy the ships to the central Mediterranean, where they would be able to cooperate with French and British warships. This resulted in the construction of the destroyer Dubrovnik in 1930–1931. Soon after she was ordered, the onset of the Great Depression meant that only one ship of the planned half-flotilla was ever built. Although three large destroyers were not going to be built, the intent that Dubrovnik might operate with several smaller destroyers persisted. In 1934, the KM decided to acquire three smaller destroyers to operate in a division led by Dubrovnik.

== Description and construction ==
The Beograd class was developed from a French design, and the name ship of the class, Beograd, was built by Ateliers et Chantiers de la Loire at Nantes, France. The ship had an overall length of 98 m (321 ft 6 in), a beam of 9.45 m (31 ft), and a normal draught of 3.18 m (10 ft 5 in). Her standard displacement was 1,210 tonnes (1,190 long tons), increasing to 1,655 t (1,629 long tons) at full load. The crew consisted of 145 officers and enlisted men. The ship was powered by Curtis steam turbines driving two propellers, using steam generated by three Yarrow water-tube boilers. Her turbines were rated between 40,000–44,000 shaft horsepower (30,000–33,000 kW) and she was designed to reach a top speed of 38–39 knots (70–72 km/h; 44–45 mph), although she was only able to reach a practical top speed of 35 knots (65 km/h; 40 mph) in service. She carried 120 tonnes (120 long tons) of fuel oil, which gave her a range of 1,000 nautical miles (1,900 km; 1,200 mi).

Her main armament consisted of four Škoda 120 mm (4.7 in) L/46 (Note: L/46 denotes the length of the gun. In this case, the L/46 gun is 46 calibre, meaning that the gun was 46 times as long as the diameter of its bore.) superfiring guns in single mounts, two forward of the superstructure and two aft, protected by gun shields. Her secondary armament consisted of four Škoda 40 mm (1.6 in) anti-aircraft (AA) guns in two twin mounts, located on either side of the aft shelter deck. She was also equipped with two triple mounts of 550 mm (22 in) torpedo tubes and two machine guns. Her fire-control system was provided by the Dutch firm of Hazemayer. As built, she could also carry 30 naval mines. She was laid down in 1936, launched on 23 December 1937, and was commissioned into the KM on 28 April 1939.

== Service history ==
=== Yugoslavia ===
Less than a month after being commissioned, Beograd was sent to the United Kingdom with a large part of Yugoslavia's gold reserve, 7,344 ingots, to be lodged with the Bank of England for safekeeping. At the time Yugoslavia entered World War II as a result of the German-led Axis invasion of Yugoslavia in April 1941, Beograd and her sister ship Zagreb were allocated to the 1st Torpedo Division at the Bay of Kotor. To prevent a bridgehead being established at Zara, an Italian enclave on the Dalmatian coast, Beograd, four 250t-class torpedo boats and six motor torpedo boats were dispatched to the port of Šibenik, 80 kilometres (50 mi) to the south of Zara, in preparation for an attack. The attack was to be coordinated with the 12th Infantry Division Jadranska and two combined regiments of the Royal Yugoslav Army attacking from the Benkovac area, supported by the Royal Yugoslav Air Force's 81st Bomber Group. The Yugoslavs launched their attack on 9 April, but the naval prong of the attack faltered when Beograd's starboard engine was put out of action after a series of near misses from Italian aircraft off Šibenik. The destroyer then limped to the Bay of Kotor for repairs, escorted by the remainder of the force. She was captured there by Italian forces on 17 April.

=== Italy ===
In Italian service, Beograd was refitted and repaired. A new director was fitted on her bridge and 20 mm (0.79 in) L/65 Breda Model 35 guns were added to her armament. She was commissioned in the Royal Italian Navy (Italian: Regia Marina) under the name Sebenico in August 1941, and served as a convoy escort on routes between Italy and the Aegean and North Africa, completing more than 100 missions over a two-year period. On 18 October 1941, off the Italian island of Lampedusa, the British submarine HMS Ursula sank a steamer that was under escort by a force that included Sebenico. On 29 March 1942, Sebenico and three torpedo boats were escorting a convoy off Brindisi when the British submarine HMS Proteus sank one of the escorted freighters. She retained her searchlight amidships and her aft director until at least mid-1942. According to the naval historian M. J. Whitley, it is likely that her aft torpedo tubes were removed towards the end of her time in Italian hands in order to make space for additional anti-aircraft armament, but the details of what weapons may have been fitted are not known.

=== Germany ===
When the Italians capitulated in September 1943, the German Navy (German: Kriegsmarine) seized Sebenico in the port of Venice on 9 September and renamed her TA43 (German: Torpedoboot Ausland 43). The term Ausland and prefix TA were used to denote that she was a captured vessel put into German service. At the time of her capture she was either damaged or had been made unserviceable by her crew. While in German service her anti-aircraft armament was improved using space provided by removing one of the triple torpedo mounts. She was fitted with seven 37 mm (1.5 in) guns in one double-mount and five single-mounts, as well as two single-mount 20 mm (0.79 in) guns. In February 1945 she was allocated to the 9th Torpedo Boat Flotilla, which consisted entirely of captured destroyers and torpedo boats. She was used for escort work and on minelaying duties in the northern Adriatic. As late as 1 April 1945, TA43 was still in commission and available to fight, although she saw little action.

Naval history sources differ on her final fate. According to Roger Chesneau, she was sunk at the port of Trieste by Yugoslav People's Army artillery fire on 30 April 1945, and was raised in June 1946, probably to remove her as a navigation hazard, and she was scuttled a month later. David Brown records that she was scuttled at Trieste on 1 May 1945. Maurizio Brescia states she was scuttled by the Germans at Trieste on 1 May 1945 and was broken up in 1947.
