= ZB-60 =

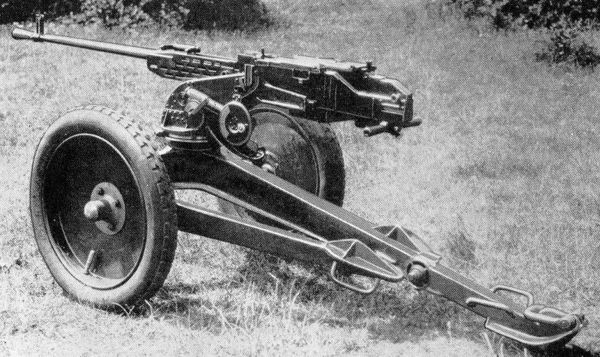
- Type: Heavy machine gun
- Place of origin: Czechoslovakia

Service history
- In service: 1938–1944
- Used by: See § Users
- Wars: World War II

Production history
- Designer: Zbrojovka Brno
- Designed: 1933–1937
- Manufacturer: Zbrojovka Vsetín
- Produced: 1938–1944

Specifications
- Mass: Gun on wheeled tripod: 203 kg (447.54 lb); Gun only: 55 kg (121.25 lb)
- Length: 2,050 mm (6 ft 8.71 in)
- Barrel length: 1,460 mm (57.48 in)
- Shell: 15×104mm Brno
- Caliber: 15 mm (0.59 in)
- Action: Gas operated, open bolt
- Carriage: Two-wheel tripod
- Rate of fire: 420 rounds/min
- Muzzle velocity: 860 to 930 m/s (2,800 to 3,100 ft/s)
- Effective firing range: 1,800 m (1,970 yd)
- Feed system: 40-round belt
- Sights: Bladed post front, adjustable sight rear

The ZB-60 was a heavy machine gun designed by Zbrojovka Brno in Czechoslovakia during the 1930s.

== History ==
Design efforts started in the early 1930's for a 20mm automatic gun for anti-tank service. In 1933, the design parameters were altered to the 15×104mm Škoda round as a large caliber heavy machine gun. As early as 1934 the ZB-60 was tested by the Czechoslovak military, which did not adopt it due to accuracy concerns and excessive recoil even with its weight. For several years it was planned as a fortification gun where the recoil could be easily managed by stronger mounts, until the heavy machine gun was dropped from the fortification concepts.

Nazi Germany acquired a number of guns after the occupation of Czechoslovakia in March 1939 were taken into Wehrmacht service as the 15 mm Fla. MG 39(t). Under German occupation, new guns were produced for the Wehrmacht and Kriegsmarine. After the Invasion of Yugoslavia, former Yugoslav guns were designated as the 15 mm Fla. MG 490(j). The Germans used them as anti-aircraft guns during World War II.

The British acquired a license, and later developed their 15 mm Besa machine gun from the ZB-60 for service on armored fighting vehicles.

== Users ==
- Germany
- Iran − A batch was sold to Iran.
- Slovakia
- United Kingdom
- Yugoslavia − In 1937 the ZB-60 was adopted by Yugoslavia as the Mitraljez 15 mm M.38.

== See also ==
- Weapons of Czechoslovakia interwar period

== Sources ==
- Gander, Terry and Chamberlain, Peter. Weapons of the Third Reich: An Encyclopedic Survey of All Small Arms, Artillery and Special Weapons of the German Land Forces 1939-1945. New York: Doubleday, 1979 ISBN 0-385-15090-3
- Kliment, Charles K.; Nakládal, Bretislav (1997). Germany's First Ally: Armed Forces of the Slovak State 1939-1945. Schiffer Pub. ISBN 0-7643-0589-1.
