= List of shipwrecks in September 1943 =

The list of shipwrecks in 1943 includes ships sunk, foundered, grounded, or otherwise lost during September 1943.

== 1 September ==
List of shipwrecks: 1 September 1943
Ship	State	Description
Fusei Maru	Japan	World War II: Convoy No. 297: The cargo ship (2,256 GRT) was torpedoed and damaged one hour before midnight by USS Seawolf (United States Navy). Her captain ordered "abandon ship" at midnight. 11 crew were killed. The empty ship was shelled and sunk in the South China Sea off Formosa (31°16′N 127°14′E) by Seawolf three hours later, in the early hours of 2 September.
Haryu Maru	Japan	The cargo ship lost power 100 miles (160 km) east north east off Dairen, Manchuria. She collided with another vessel and subsequently drifted aground near Dawangjia Dao Island, China, south of the Yalu River the next day. The vessel was later declared a total loss. Her Italian commanding officer was rescued on 9 September.
I-182	Imperial Japanese Navy	World War II: The Kaidai-class submarine was depth charged and sunk in the Coral Sea off Espiritu Santo (15°38′S 166°57′E) by USS Wadsworth (United States Navy). All 101 crew were killed.
HMS LCS(L) 201	Royal Navy	The LCS-1-class landing craft support (20/25 t, 1943) sank in the English Channel off Hastings (50°52′N 0°44′E) after a collision with LCS-202 (Royal Navy). There were no casualties.
Nankai Maru	Japan	World War II: The coaster was torpedoed and sunk in the Pacific Ocean off the coast of Japan by USS Pompano (United States Navy).
Strassburg	Germany	World War II: The hospital ship (17,001 GRT, 1930) struck a mine in the North Sea off Egmond aan Zee, North Holland, Netherlands and was beached (52°29′18″N 4°32′23″E). The ship was torpedoed by aircraft of 236 and 254 Squadrons, Royal Air Force on 20 September and also by HMMTB 617 (Royal Navy). She was declared a total loss.
V 5502	Kriegsmarine	The Vorpostenboot, a former Trygg-class torpedo boat, ran aground on the Norwegian coast. She sank on 6 September during salvage operations.

== 2 September ==
List of shipwrecks: 2 September 1943
Ship	State	Description
Hankow Maru	Imperial Japanese Army	World War II: Convoy Wewak No. 7: The Shanghai Maru-class auxiliary transport (4,104 GRT) was bombed and sunk at Wewak, New Guinea (3°3′S 121°30′E) by North American B-25 Mitchell and Lockheed P-38 Lightning aircraft of the United States Army Air Force. Twenty-three troops and two crew were killed.
HMS LCI(L) 107	Royal Navy	The landing craft infantry (large) (194/384 t, 1942) was driven ashore in bad weather at Reggio, Italy, and was written off as a total loss.
Mutsure	Imperial Japanese Navy	World War II: The Etorofu-class escort ship was torpedoed and sunk in the Pacific Ocean off Guam (08°40′N 151°31′E) by USS Snapper (United States Navy). Forty-six crew were killed.
Nagato Maru	Imperial Japanese Army	World War II: Convoy Wewak No. 7: The Daifuku Maru No. 1-class transport (5,901 GRT) was bombed and sunk at Wewak (3°35′S 143°39′E) by North American B-25 Mitchell and Lockheed P-38 Lightning aircraft of the United States Army Air Force. Three troops and two crew were killed.
Svea Reuter	Sweden	World War II: The cargo ship, chartered by the Kriegsmarine, was torpedoed in the Riga Bay by Soviet Ilyushin Il-4 aircraft. Six crew were killed. She was towed to Riga and repaired.
Versilia	Italy	World War II: The cargo ship (591 GRT) was torpedoed and sunk in the Aegean Sea off Patmos Island, Greece, by HMS Torbay (Royal Navy). There were 10 dead and 7 survivors.

== 3 September ==
List of shipwrecks: 3 September 1943
Ship	State	Description
Akama Maru	Japan	World War II: The cargo ship (5,600 GRT) was torpedoed and sunk in the Pacific Ocean off the coast of Japan (41°00′N 144°34′E) by USS Pompano (United States Navy). Ten crew were killed.
I-20	Imperial Japanese Navy	World War II: The Type C submarine (or possibly I-182) was depth charged and sunk in the Coral Sea off Espiritu Santo (13°10′S 165°28′E) by USS Ellet (United States Navy) with all 101 hands.
Tagonoura Maru	Imperial Japanese Navy	World War II: Convoy 4827: The Koto Maru No. 2 Go-class auxiliary collier/oiler (3,521 GRT) was torpedoed and sunk in the Pacific Ocean about 32 nautical miles (59 km; 37 mi) south east of Miyake-Jima, Izu Shoto (33°43′N 143°00′E) by USS Pollack (United States Navy). Six wounded or sick naval soldiers who were passengers and one crewman were killed. 149 survivors were rescued by Oki (Imperial Japanese Navy).
UJ 1202 Frank Dankworh name=	Kriegsmarine	World War II: The submarine chaser was torpedoed and sunk by S-51 (Soviet Navy) off Finnmark, Norway.

== 4 September ==
List of shipwrecks: 4 September 1943
Ship	State	Description
Heijo Maru	Imperial Japanese Navy	World War II: The Standard Peacetime Type C cargo ship/Heijo Maru-class auxiliary gunboat (2,627 GRT) was torpedoed and sunk in the Pacific Ocean off Kwajalein (5°25′N 156°37′E) by USS Albacore (United States Navy). Three crewmen were killed.
Kozan Maru	Imperial Japanese Army	World War II: The Shinshu Maru-class transport ship (4,180 GRT) was torpedoed in the South China Sea 90 kilometres (56 mi) south west of Takao, Formosa (22°22′N 120°04′E) by USS Sunfish (United States Navy). Thirteen passengers and 9 crew were killed. On 5 September the gunboat Chohakusan Maru (Imperial Japanese Navy) tried to tow the damaged ship but flooding was increasing so Kozan Maru was run aground and abandoned at 22°06′N 119°50′E.
USS LCI(L)-339	United States Navy	World War II: The landing craft infantry (large) was sunk by Japanese aircraft off Lae, New Guinea. One crew was killed.
HMS LCP(L) 325	Royal Navy	The landing craft, personnel (large) (6/8 t, 1941) was lost on this date.
Yurin Maru	Japan	World War II: The sailing vessel was sunk in the Pacific Ocean by USS Tarpon (United States Navy).
Yusho Maru	Imperial Japanese Navy	World War II: The Yusho Maru-class salvage ship (a.k.a. Yusyo Maru) struck a mine in Surabaya's North Channel and was taken under tow. She struck a second mine and sank in the Makassar Strait (05°00′S 119°00′E) on 5 September. Refloated on 12 July 1944 and towed to Surabaya, never repaired, and possibly scrapped.

== 5 September ==
List of shipwrecks: 5 September 1943
Ship	State	Description
Cremer	Netherlands	The cargo liner (4,608 GRT, 1926) ran aground and was wrecked on either St. Bees Island, or Whitsunday Island, Australia, and was abandoned as a total loss.
F 421	Kriegsmarine	World War II: The Type C Marinefahrprahm was sunk by a mine off Gaeta, Italy. There were 15 dead and missing and 17 survivors.
F 481	Kriegsmarine	World War II: The Type C2 Marinefahrprahm was sunk by a mine off Gaeta, Italy. There were 19 dead and missing and 13 wounded.
F 624	Kriegsmarine	World War II: The Type C2 Marinefahrprahm was thrown onto the beach of Pizzo, Italy in a storm and was damaged beyond repair.
HMS ML 108	Royal Navy	World War II: The Fairmile A motor launch (57/66 t, 1940) was sunk by a mine in the English Channel. The whole crew was saved.
No. 13	Soviet Navy	The R Type minesweeper was lost on this date.
R-12	Kriegsmarine	World War II: The Type R-2 minesweeper was sunk by a mine off Piran.
Tenkai Maru	Imperial Japanese Army	World War II: Convoy Wewak No. 8: The Tenkai Maru-class auxiliary transport ship (3,203 GRT) was torpedoed and sunk in the Pacific Ocean (01°10′N 142°10′E) by USS Swordfish (United States Navy). Three troops and three (or four) crew were killed.
Urlana	United Kingdom	The cargo ship ran aground in Loch Bracadale. She was on a voyage from Buenos Aires, Argentina to London. Shen was a total loss.
USS YP-279	United States Navy	The district patrol craft (167 GRT) sank in heavy weather after engine failure and springing leaks off Townsville, Queensland, Australia (26°11′S 153°12′W). There were no casualties.

== 6 September ==
List of shipwrecks: 6 September 1943
Ship	State	Description
Angiolina P	Italy	World War II: The fishing vessel was sunk at Aléria, Corsica by gunfire from HMS Sportsman (Royal Navy)
Annan Maru	Imperial Japanese Army	World War II: The Annan Maru-class auxiliary transport (2,941 GRT) was bombed and sunk in the Indian Ocean south of Rangoon, Burma by Consolidated B-24 Liberator aircraft of the United States Tenth Air Force. Two crew were killed.
Kofuku Maru	Imperial Japanese Navy	The Kofuku Maru-class auxiliary transport ship (3,209 GRT) was sunk in a collision with Maoka Maru (Japan) in the Sea of Japan 20 nautical miles (37 km) south of Sado Island (37°42′N 138°17′E). Her whole crew was rescued by Maoka Maru.
Maria Luisa B	Italy	World War II: The fishing vessel was sunk in Aléria, Corsica by gunfire from HMS Sportsman (Royal Navy)
Milan Maru	Imperial Japanese Army	World War II: The Yoshida Maru No. 1-class auxiliary transport was bombed and sunk in the Indian Ocean south of Rangoon, Burma (16°46′N 96°10′E) by Consolidated B-24 Liberator aircraft of the United States Tenth Air Force. Eight crew and 121 troops were killed.
MO-110	Soviet Navy	World War II: The MO-2-class patrol vessel was sunk by a mine in the Gulf of Finland. 17 crew were killed. There were 4 survivors.
HMS Puckeridge	Royal Navy	World War II: The Hunt-class destroyer (1,050/1,430 t, 1941) was torpedoed and sunk in the Mediterranean Sea 40 nautical miles (74 km) east of Europa Point, Gibraltar by U-617 (Kriegsmarine) with the loss of 62 of her 191 crew.
R 94	Kriegsmarine	World War II: The minesweeper struck a mine and sank in the English Channel.
Sellindge	United Kingdom	World War II: The cargo ship struck a mine and sank off Malta.
Shogen Maru	Japan	World War II: The cargo ship was torpedoed and sunk in the Pacific Ocean off Hokkaido (42°13′N 142°00′E) by USS Halibut (United States Navy). Survivors were rescued by Kiku Maru (Imperial Japanese Navy).
Tbilisi	Soviet Union	World War II: The cargo ship (7,169 GRT) struck a mine laid by U-636 (Kriegsmarine) and sank in the Kara Sea (72°22′04″N 80°33′01″E) with the loss of one crew and one passenger. 43 crew survived, 6 of them badly wounded.

== 7 September ==
List of shipwrecks: 7 September 1943
Ship	State	Description
Hamidieh	Egypt	World War II: The sailing ship was shelled and sunk in the Mediterranean Sea 34 nautical miles (63 km) south of Cape Gata, Cyprus (34°02′N 33°05′E) by U-596 (Kriegsmarine). All crew survived.
K-12	Soviet Navy	World War II: The tug was sunk in the Baltic Sea by Taisto, Tuima, Tuuli, and Jyske (Finnish Navy).
Krupskaya	Germany	World War II: The barge was sunk in the Black Sea by mines dropped by Soviet Ilyushin Il-4 aircraft.
LTP-11	Soviet Navy	World War II: The barge was sunk in the Baltic Sea by Taisto, Tuima, Tuuli, and Jyske (Finnish Navy) while being towed by K-12 (Soviet Navy).
Maloja	Switzerland	World War II: The steamship, on its last voyage, was erroneously sunk in the Mediterranean Sea by ten British aircraft at 16:15 off Cap Revellata, Corsica. Three crew members lost their lives.
USS PT-118	United States Navy	World War II: The Elco 80' PT boat ran aground off Vella Lavella and was scuttled.
USS PT-172	United States Navy	World War II: The Elco 80' PT boat ran aground off Vella Lavella and was scuttled.
U-760	Kriegsmarine	World War II: The Type VIIC submarine was severely damaged by depth charges from a Vickers Wellington aircraft of 179 Squadron, Royal Air Force. She put into Ferrol, Spain, where she was interned on 9 September.
Velella	Regia Marina	World War II: The Argo-class submarine was torpedoed and sunk off Salerno (40°07′N 14°50′E) by HMS Shakespeare (Royal Navy).

== 8 September ==
List of shipwrecks: 8 September 1943
Ship	State	Description
Calitea II	Regia Marina	World War II: The cargo ship, under charter to the Imperial Japanese Navy as a supply ship, was scuttled by her crew at Kobe, Japan, after the Italian government surrendered to the Allies. Raised in 1943, repaired and put into Japanese service as Ikutagawa Maru.
Etna	Regia Marina	World War II: The incomplete Etna-class cruiser, only 84% finished, was scuttled in Zaule Bay near Trieste. Raised by the Germans.
Hakutetsu Maru No. 13	Japan	World War II: The cargo ship (1,334 GRT) was torpedoed and sunk in the Pacific Ocean off Hollandia, New Guinea (2°30′S 141°44′E) by USS Drum (United States Navy). 16 crew, 2 gunners and 81 passengers were killed.
HMS LCT 624	Royal Navy	The LCT-4-class landing craft tank (350/640 t, 1943) was lost in the Mediterranean Sea.
M 3810	Kriegsmarine	World War II: The auxiliary minesweeper was sunk in the English Channel off Fécamp, Seine-Inférieure, France by HMS MTB 211, HMS MTB 249 and HMS MTB 255 (all Royal Navy).
M 3811 Clara	Kriegsmarine	World War II: The naval drifter/minesweeper was sunk in the English Channel off Fécamp by HMS MTB 211, HMMTB 249 and HMMTB 255 (all Royal Navy).
M 3816 Sursom Corda	Kriegsmarine	World War II: The naval drifter/minesweeper was sunk in the English Channel off Fécamp by HMS MTB 211, HMMTB 249 and HMMTB 255 (all Royal Navy).
HMS MTB 77	Royal Navy	World War II: The Vosper 72'-class motor torpedo boat (42 GRT) was bombed and sunk off Vibo Valentia, Italy by German aircraft. All abaord, including an admiral, were rescued.
Rauenthaler	Germany	World War II: The cargo ship (3,727 GRT, 1940) was lost in a collision with Signal (Germany) off Trondheim, Norway whilst in a convoy.
U-983	Kriegsmarine	The Type VIIC submarine (1,070 GRT) collided in the Baltic Sea north of Loba (54°46′N 17°14′E) with the submarine U-988 (Kriegsmarine) and sank with the loss of five of her 43 crew.
Vesuvio	Regia Marina	World War II: The incomplete Etna-class cruiser, only 60% finished, was scuttled in Zaule Bay near Trieste. Raised by the Germans.

== 9 September ==
List of shipwrecks: 9 September 1943
Ship	State	Description
Ammiraglio des Geneys	Regia Marina	World War II: The Pisani-class submarine was scuttled at Pola.
Antonio Bajamonti	Regia Marina	World War II: The Osvetnik-class submarine was scuttled at La Spezia.
Antonio da Noli	Regia Marina	World War II: The Navigatori-class destroyer struck a mine and sank in the Strait of Bonifacio. 223 crew were killed.
Aradam	Regia Marina	World War II: The Adua-class submarine was bombed and sunk at Genoa by Allied aircraft.
Berenice	Regia Marina	World War II: The Gabbiano-class corvette was shelled and sunk by German batteries at Trieste.
Buccari	Regia Marina	World War II: The Fasana-class minelayer was scuttled at La Spezia.
Carlotto	Regia Marina	World War II: The gunboat was scuttled at Shanghai, China.
Cattaro	Regia Marina	World War II: The auxiliary cruiser was scuttled at "Santa Margharita".
Conte Verde	Italy	World War II: The ocean liner was scuttled in the Huangpu River at Shanghai by her Italian crew. She was refloated by the Japanese, repaired and taken in to service as Kotobuki Maru.
RFA Derwentdale	Royal Fleet Auxiliary	World War II: Operation Avalanche: The Landing Ship, Gantry was bombed and severely damaged at Salerno, Italy. Subsequently towed to the United Kingdom, repaired and returned to service.
Drachenfels	Germany	World War II: The cargo ship was set afire and scuttled at Mormugao, Portuguese India. The wreck was refloated in December 1950, beached and scrapped.
Euterpe	Regia Marina	World War II: The Gabbiano-class corvette was scuttled at La Spezia. Raised, repaired and put into Kriegsmarine service as UJ-2228.
F 366	Kriegsmarine	World War II: The Marinefährprahm was sunk at Bastia, Corsica, France by Aliseo and Cormorano (both Regia Marina). One crew was killed.
F 387	Kriegsmarine	World War II: The Marinefährprahm was sunk at Bastia by Aliseo and Cormorano (both Regia Marina). There was no casualty.
F 459	Kriegsmarine	World War II: The Marinefährprahm was sunk at Bastia by Aliseo and Cormorano (both Regia Marina).
F 612	Kriegsmarine	World War II: The Marinefährprahm was sunk at Bastia by Aliseo and Cormorano (both Regia Marina).
F 623	Kriegsmarine	World War II: The Marinefährprahm was sunk at Bastia by Aliseo and Cormorano (both Regia Marina).
FR 22	Regia Marina	World War II: The Chacal-class destroyer was scuttled at La Spezia.
FR 51	Regia Marina	World War II: The Élan-class corvette was scuttled at La Spezia, Italy. Raised, repaired and put in Kriegsmarine service as SG 23, later UJ-2231 (Kriegsmarine).
FR 118	Regia Marina	World War II: The Redoutable-class submarine was scuttled at Genoa, Italy. Wreck later scrapped by Germany.
Generale Achille Papa	Regia Marina	World War II: The Generali-class torpedo boat was scuttled at La Spezia. Raised, repaired and put in Kriegsmarine service as SG 20.
Generale Antonio Cascino	Regia Marina	World War II: The Generali-class torpedo boat was scuttled at La Spezia.
Generale Carlo Montanari	Regia Marina	World War II: The Generali-class torpedo boat was scuttled at La Spezia. Raised by the Germans but not repaired.
Ghibli	Regia Marina	World War II: The Ciclone-class torpedo boat was scuttled at La Spezia. Raised by the Germans, but not repaired.
Giovanni Bausan	Regia Marina	World War II: The Pisani-class submarine was scuttled at Pula.
Koyo Maru	Japan	World War II: The cargo ship (3,022 GRT) was attacked in the Pacific Ocean off Honshu by USS Harder (United States Navy). Only one of three torpedoes hit, and it was a dud, but it caused enough flooding that Koyo Maru later sank under tow the same day 35°23′N 140°38′E. There were no casualties.
USS LCT-366	United States Navy	The LCI-1-class landing craft tank sank in heavy weather in the Gulf of Alaska south of Kodiak, Territory of Alaska, at 53°01′N 152°00′E.
HMS LCT 391	Royal Navy	World War II: The Mk 3 landing craft tank (350/640 t, 1942) was sunk by coastal gunfire during the landing at Salerno. Three of the troops aboard were killed.
HMS LCT 572	Royal Navy	World War II: The LCT-4-class landing craft tank (350/640 t, 1943) was sunk by a mine during the landing at Salerno. 15 of the troops aboard were killed.
HMS LCT 626	Royal Navy	The LCT-4-class landing craft tank (350/640 t, 1943) was lost in the Mediterranean Sea.
Larchbank	United Kingdom	World War II: The Inverbank-class cargo ship (5,150 GRT, 1925) was torpedoed and sunk in the Indian Ocean 200 nautical miles (370 km) west of Cape Cormorin (07°38′N 74°00′E) by I-27 (Imperial Japanese Navy). Six gunners and 40 crew were killed, 30 survivors were rescued by Tahania (United Kingdom) and Panaman (United States).
Lepanto	Regia Marina	World War II: The gunboat, a former Azio-class minelayer was scuttled at Shanghai, China. Raised, repaired and put in Imperial Japanese Navy service as Okitsu.
Lira	Regia Marina	World War II: The Spica-class torpedo boat was scuttled at La Spezia. Raised, repaired and put in Kriegsmarine service as TA49.
MAS 424	Regia Marina	World War II: The MAS 424-class MAS boat was scuttled at Toulon, Var, France. Raised, repaired and put into Kriegsmarine service as S 624.
MAS 427	Regia Marina	World War II: The MAS 423-class MAS boat was scuttled at Pula. Raised, repaired and put in Kriegsmarine service as S 604.
MAS 437	Regia Marina	World War II: The MAS 423-class MAS boat was scuttled at Toulon, France. Raised, repaired and put in Kriegsmarine service as S 625.
MAS 525	Regia Marina	World War II: The MAS 501-class MAS boat was scuttled at La Spezia. Raised, repaired and put in Kriegsmarine service as S 508.
MAS 553	Regia Marina	World War II: The MAS 552-class MAS boat was scuttled at La Spezia. Raised, repaired and put in Kriegsmarine service as SA 14.
MS 16	Regia Marina	World War II: The MS 11-class MS boat was scuttled at Voltri. Raised, repaired and put in Kriegsmarine service as SA 1.
MS 32	Regia Marina	World War II: The MS 11-class MS boat was scuttled at Viareggio.
MS 34	Regia Marina	World War II: The MS 11-class MS boat was scuttled at Bocca di Magra. Raised, repaired and put in Kriegsmarine service as SA 2.
MS 36	Regia Marina	World War II: The MS 11-class MS boat was scuttled at La Spezia. Raised, repaired and put in Kriegsmarine service as SA 3.
MS 41	Regia Marina	World War II: The Lursen E boat was scuttled at Molfalcone. Raised, but not repaired.
MS 51	Regia Marina	World War II: The MS 51-class MS boat was scuttled at Bocche di Marga. Raised, repaired and put in Kriegsmarine service as SA 4.
HMIS MTB 284	Royal Indian Navy	World War II: The Vosper 72'-class motor torpedo boat (37/45 t, 1943) was lost as cargo when Larchbank (United Kingdom) was sunk by I-27 (Imperial Japanese Navy) in the Indian Ocean (07°38′N 74°00′E).
HMIS MTB 285	Royal Indian Navy	World War II: The Vosper 72'-class motor torpedo boat (37/45 t, 1943) was lost as cargo when Larchbank (United Kingdom) was sunk by I-27 (Imperial Japanese Navy) in the Indian Ocean (07°38′N 74°00′E).
Murena	Regia Marina	World War II: The Flutto-class submarine was scuttled at La Spezia, Italy. Raised, repaired and put in Kriegsmarine service as UIT-16.
USS Nauset	United States Navy	World War II: The Navajo-class fleet tug was bombed and sunk in the Gulf of Salerno by Luftwaffe aircraft with the loss of 18 of her 113 crew.
Nicolò Zeno	Regia Marina	World War II: The Navigatori-class destroyer was scuttled at La Spezia, Italy.
Pelagose	Regia Marina	World War II: The Fasana-class minelayer was shelled and sunk off Genoa by German artillery.
Persefone	Regia Marina	World War II: The Gabbiano-class corvette was scuttled at La Spezia. Raised, repaired and put in Kriegsmarine service as UJ 2227.
Procione	Regia Marina	World War II: The Orsa-class torpedo boat was scuttled at La Spezia.
R-7 and R-13	Kriegsmarine	World War II: The Type R-2 minesweepers were scuttled at Salerno, Italy.
R 240 Vulcania	Regia Marina	World War II: The auxiliary minesweeper was torpedoed and sunk in the Adriatic Sea by S 54 and S61 (both Kriegsmarine).
RD 13	Regia Marina	World War II: The RD-class minesweeper was scuttled at Viareggio.
Roma	Regia Marina	Roma World War II: The Littorio-class battleship was sunk in the Mediterranean Sea off Asinara by a Fritz X launched by a Dornier Do 217 of the Luftwaffe with the loss of 1,393 of her 2,021 crew.
Silvano	Italy	World War II: The cargo ship was scuttled at Naples, Italy. Wreck raised in 1944 and scrapped.
Sirena	Regia Marina	World War II: The Sirena-class submarine was scuttled at La Maddalena, Sicily.
Taranto	Regia Marina	World War II: The Magdeburg-class cruiser was scuttled at La Spezia. Later raised by the Germans, and sunk twice more. Scrapped in 1946-47.
Toni II	Germany	World War II: The severely damaged tanker was scuttled at Naples. She was raised in 1946, repaired and entered Italian service in 1948 as Vampa.
Ugolino Vivaldi	Regia Marina	World War II: The Navigatori-class destroyer was shelled by German shore batteries and bombed by German aircraft off La Maddalena, sinking the next day. 60 of her 280 crew did not survive the battle, the sinking or the ordeal at sea that followed. A part of the survivors were rescued by HMS Sportsman (Royal Navy).
UJ 2203 Austral	Kriegsmarine	World War II: The naval trawler/submarine chaser was sunk at Bastia by Aliseo and Cormorano (both Regia Marina).
UJ 2219 Insuma	Kriegsmarine	World War II: The armed yacht/submarine chaser was sunk at Bastia by Aliseo and Cormorano (both Regia Marina).
Valverde	Italy	World War II: The cargo ship was sunk by Kriegsmarine E-boats off "Castellogncello".
VAS 207 and VAS 225	Regia Marina	World War II: The VAS 201-class submarine chasers were scuttled at Bocca di Magra.
VAS 234	Regia Marina	World War II: The VAS 231-class submarine chaser was sunk by gunfire from R-212 and R-215 Kriegsmarine off Gorgona Island. Contrammiraglio Federico Martinengo, commander of the Italian Navy ASW forces, was the only person killed in the action.
VAS 236	Regia Marina	World War II: The VAS 231-class submarine chaser was scuttled at Portovenere. Raised, repaired and put into Kriegsmarine service as RA 261.
VAS 244	Regia Marina	World War II: The VAS 231-class submarine chaser was sunk by Allied aircraft off Salerno.
Volframio	Regia Marina	World War II: The Acciaio-class submarine was scuttled at La Maddalena. Raised by the Germans.

== 10 September ==
List of shipwrecks: 10 September 1943
Ship	State	Description
HMS Abdiel	Royal Navy	World War II: The Abdiel-class minelayer (2,650/3,780 t, 1941) struck a mine and sank at Taranto, Apulia, Italy (40°29′N 17°15′E) with the loss of 151 of the 276 people on board.
Antonio Pigafetta	Regia Marina	World War II: The Navigatori-class destroyer was scuttled at Fiume, Italy. Raised, repaired and put into Kriegsmarine service as TA44.
Ardor	Italy	World War II: The tanker was bombed and set on fire by Junkers Ju 87 aircraft of the Luftwaffe off Kotor, Croatia. Eleven of her 21 crew were killed and the survivors abandoned her. Left adrift, she ran aground and was sunk by a new air attack on 12 September.
Argo	Regia Marina	World War II: The Argo-class submarine was scuttled at Monfalcone, Italy.
DB-2, DB-3, DB-19, DB-22 and DB-34	Soviet Navy	The No. 1-class landing boats were lost on this date.
F 478	Kriegsmarine	World War II: The Type C2 Marinefahrprahm was scuttled off Taranto, Italy, after an Italian cruiser was seen and the whole crew was rescued by S 54 and S61 (both Kriegsmarine).
FC 45 Fortis	Kriegsmarine	The naval trawler was lost on this date.
Insidioso	Regia Marina	World War II: The Indomito-class torpedo boat was scuttled by her crew at Pola, Italy. She was refloated and repaired by the Germans and placed in service as Wildfang (Kriegsmarine).
No. 064	Soviet Navy	The MO-4-class submarine chaser was sunk on this date.
No. 71	Soviet Navy	The G-5-class motor torpedo boat was lost on this date.
No. 122	Soviet Navy	The G-5-class motor torpedo boat was lost on this date.
Piero Foscari	Regia Marina	World War II: The auxiliary cruiser was sunk at Castiglioncello, Italy, by German ships. One crew was killed.
RTShch-104	Soviet Navy	The K-15/M-17-class river minesweeping launch was sunk on this date.
SKA-025	Soviet Navy	World War II: The torpedo boat was sunk in the Black Sea by German action off the Kuban coast.
SKA-032	Soviet Navy	World War II: The torpedo boat was sunk in the Black Sea by German action off the Kuban coast.
SKA-084	Soviet Navy	World War II: The torpedo boat was sunk in the Black Sea by German action off the Kuban coast.
STS-124	Soviet Navy	World War II: The G-5-class torpedo boat was sunk in the Black Sea by German action off the Kuban coast.
STS-125	Soviet Navy	World War II: The torpedo boat was sunk in the Black Sea by German action off the Kuban coast.
T8	Regia Marina	World War II: The T-class torpedo boat was sunk in the Adriatic Sea northwest of Dubrovnic by Luftwaffe aircraft.
VAS 208	Regia Marina	World War II: The submarine chaser was shelled and sunk at Piombino by German shore-based artillery.
VAS 214	Regia Marina	World War II: The submarine chaser was shelled and sunk at Piombino by German shore-based artillery.
VAS 219	Regia Marina	World War II: The submarine chaser was shelled and sunk at Piombino by German shore-based artillery.
VAS 220	Regia Marina	World War II: The submarine chaser was shelled and sunk at Piombino by German shore-based artillery.
VAS 247	Regia Marina	World War II: The VAS 231-class submarine chaser was sunk by a Kriegsmarine Marinefährprahm off Civitavecchia.
W-16	Imperial Japanese Navy	World War II: The No.13-class minesweeper was bombed and sunk in Makassar Strait south of Makassar, Netherlands East Indies (06°08′S 119°20′E) by Consolidated B-24 Liberator aircraft of the United States Fifth Air Force.

== 11 September ==
List of shipwrecks: 11 September 1943
Ship	State	Description
Anke	Germany	World War II: The cargo ship (3,782 GRT) was torpedoed and sunk in the Norwegian Sea off Trondheim, Norway by HNoMS MTB 618 and HNoMS MTB 627 (both Royal Norwegian Navy). There were two dead and 4 wounded.
Aurora	Regia Marina	World War II: The gunboat (935 GRT) was sunk off Ancona by S 61, and S 64 (both Kriegsmarine). 27 crew were killed. The 62 survivors were captured by the German and two died later in captivity.
Conte di Savoia	Italy	World War II: The ocean liner was scuttled at Malamocco, Veneto. She was refloated 16 October 1945 but deemed uneconomic to repair and scrapped in 1950 at Monfalcone, Friuli-Venezia Giulia.
Giuseppe La Masa	Regia Marina	World War II: The torpedo boat, a former La Masa-class destroyer, was scuttled at Naples.
Hokusho Maru	Imperial Japanese Navy	World War II: The Hokuyo Maru-class auxiliary transport ship (4,211 GRT) was torpedoed and sunk three nautical miles (5.6 km; 3.5 mi) north west of Nauru Island (0°28′N 166°52′E) by USS Narwhal (United States Navy). 32 of her crew were killed.
Humanitas	Italy	World War II: The cargo ship was torpedoed and damaged in the Tyrrhenian Sea off Corsica by HNLMS Dolfijn (Royal Netherlands Navy). She was declared a total loss.
Impetuoso	Regia Marina	World War II: The Ciclone-class torpedo boat was scuttled in Polensa Bay.
India	Norway	World War II: The tanker (9,977 GRT, 1939) was shelled and sunk in the South Pacific Ocean by Michel (Kriegsmarine) while bounded from Talara, Peru to Sydney, Australia. All 41 crewmen were killed.
USS LCT-71	United States Navy	The LCT-1-class landing craft tank sank in heavy weather in the Gulf of Alaska south of Kodiak, Territory of Alaska, at 53°38′N 146°05′E. All 12 crew were rescued by LST-479 (United States Navy).
MAS 431	Regia Marina	World War II: The MAS 423-class MAS boat was scuttled at Split, Yugoslavia. Raised, repaired and put into Kriegsmarine service as S 603.
No. 21	Soviet Navy	The G-5-class motor torpedo boat was lost on this date.
No. 55	Soviet Navy	The G-5-class motor torpedo boat was lost on this date.
No. 084	Soviet Navy	The MO-4-class submarine chaser was sunk on this date.
No. 91	Soviet Navy	The G-5-class motor torpedo boat was lost on this date.
No. 112	Soviet Navy	The G-5-class motor torpedo boat was lost on this date.
No. 125	Soviet Navy	The G-5-class motor torpedo boat was lost on this date.
Partenope	Regia Marina	World War II: The Spica-class torpedo boat was scuttled at Naples.
Pegaso	Regia Marina	World War II: The Orsa-class torpedo boat was scuttled in Polensa Bay.
Quintino Sella	Regia Marina	World War II: The Sella-class destroyer was sunk off Venice by S 61, and S 54 (both (Kriegsmarine)).
USS Rowan	United States Navy	World War II: Operation Avalanche: The Benham-class destroyer was torpedoed and sunk in the Mediterranean Sea off Salerno, Italy by a Kriegsmarine E-boat with the loss of 202 of her 273 crew.
USS Savannah	United States Navy	USS Savannah World War II: Operation Avalanche: The Brooklyn-class cruiser was struck by a Fritz X bomb and severely damaged with the loss of 197 of her 868 crew. She sailed to Malta for temporary repairs. After permanent repairs in the United States, she re-entered service in September 1944.
S 46	Kriegsmarine	World War II: The Type 1939/40 E-boat was sunk in the Black Sea off Feodosia, Soviet Union during a Soviet air attack when strafing detonated one of her torpedoes. Two crew were killed.
T 6	Regia Marina	World War II: The T-class torpedo boat was scuttled at Cesenatico.
TA11	Kriegsmarine	World War II: The La Melpomène-class torpedo boat was sunk by Aliseo and Cormorano (both Regia Marina) and Italian tanks at Elba (42°55′N 10°32′E).
UJ-1217	Kriegsmarine	World War II: The submarine chaser was torpedoed and sunk in Syltefjorden (70°38′N 30°26′E) by M-7 (Soviet Navy). 29 of her 42 crewmen were killed.
VAS 208, VAS 214, VAS 219 and VAS 220	Regia Marina	World War II: The VAS 205-class submarine chasers were shelled and sunk by German coastal batteries off Piombino.
X5, X6, X7, X8 and X9	Royal Navy	World War II: Operation Source: The midget submarines were all expended in attacks on Lützow, Scharnhorst and Tirpitz (all Kriegsmarine) in Kåfjord and Langefjord, Norway. Of the 15 crew, nine were killed and six taken as prisoners of war.
Yoko Maru	Imperial Japanese Navy	World War II: The Yoko Maru class auxiliary transport ship (1,050 GRT) was torpedoed in the Pacific Ocean south of Mikura-jima, Izu Islands by USS Harder (United States Navy). She sank the next day about 2.7 nautical miles west south west of Mikura Jima (33°48′N 139°37′E). Eight crewmen were killed.

== 12 September ==
List of shipwrecks: 12 September 1943
Ship	State	Description
Ametista	Regia Marina	World War II: The Sirena-class submarine (678 GRT) was scuttled off Ancona. There were no casualties.
HMS LCP(L) 316	Royal Navy	The landing craft, personnel (large) (6/8 t, 1942) was lost on this date.
HMS LCP(R) 879	Royal Navy	The landing craft, personnel (ramped) (6/8 t, 1942) was lost on this date.
HMS LCV 597	Royal Navy	The landing craft vehicle was lost on this date.
MAS 518	Regia Marina	World War II: The MAS 501-class MAS boat was scuttled at Venice.
No. 171	Soviet Navy	The G-5-class motor torpedo boat was lost on this date.
NM 09 Johann Kaptinger	Kriegsmarine	The Polarstern-class naval whaler was sunk in a collision off Bodo.
USS Navajo	United States Navy	World War II: The Navajo-class fleet tug was torpedoed and sunk in the Pacific Ocean (14°58′35″S 169°17′57″E) by I-39 (Imperial Japanese Navy) with the loss of seventeen of her 80 crew.
Pugliola	Italy	World War II: The cargo ship struck a mine and sank off the Isola Sant'Andrea.
Serpente	Regia Marina	World War II: The Argonauta-class submarine (650 GRT) was scuttled off Ancona. There were no casualties.
Shonan Maru	Japan	World War II: The transport was bombed and sunk in the Paramushiro Strait by Consolidated B-24 Liberator and North American B-25 Mitchell aircraft of the United States Eleventh Air Force. Later salvaged.
Topazio	Regia Marina	World War II: The Sirena-class submarine (678 GRT) was sunk in the Mediterranean Sea off Sardinia (38°39′N 9°22′E) by a Bristol Bisley aircraft of 13 Squadron, Royal Air Force with all 49 crew.
U-617	Kriegsmarine	World War II: The Type VIIC submarine ran aground off Melilla, Spain (35°38′N 3°27′W) whilst under attack by Lockheed Hudson aircraft of 48 and 233 Squadrons, Royal Air Force and Fairey Swordfish aircraft of 833 and 886 Squadrons, Fleet Air Arm. All 49 crew survived the attack. U-617 was shelled and sunk by HMS Hyacinth (Royal Navy) and HMAS Wollongong (Royal Australian Navy).
UJ 1217 Star XXII	Kriegsmarine	The submarine chaser/naval whaler was lost on this date.

== 13 September ==
List of shipwrecks: 13 September 1943
Ship	State	Description
Caterina Madre	Italy	World War II: The cargo ship struck a mine and sank 10 nautical miles (19 km) off Sant'Andrea Island.
FR 114	Regia Marina	World War II: The Requin-class submarine was scuttled in a shipyard in Castellemmare di Stabia.
Fort Babine	United Kingdom	World War II: The Fort ship (7,135 GRT) was bombed and sunk in the Atlantic Ocean 250 nautical miles (460 km) southwest of Cape Finisterre, Spain (41°31′N 14°39′W) by Focke-Wulf Fw 200 aircraft of I./Kampfgeschwader 40, Luftwaffe. 7 gunners were killed in the attack.
HMHS Newfoundland	United Kingdom	World War II: The hospital ship (6,791 GRT, 1925) was struck by a Henschel Hs 293 glide bomb in the Mediterranean Sea 40 nautical miles (74 km) off Salerno, Italy, with the loss of 21 of her crew. The patients and surviving crew on board were rescued by USS Mayo (United States Navy). She was scuttled the next day by USS Plunkett (United States Navy).
Terra Nova	United Kingdom	The barque (764 GRT, 1884) was damaged by ice and sank in the Atlantic Ocean off the southwest tip of Greenland. Her crew were rescued by USCGC Southwind (United States Coast Guard).
HMS Uganda	Royal Navy	World War II: Operation Avalanche: The Crown Colony-class cruiser (8,875/10,850 t, 1943) was struck by a Fritz X glide bomb and severely damaged off Salerno, Sicily, Italy. She was towed to Malta by USS Narragansett (United States Navy). Following temporary repairs, she sailed to Charleston, South Carolina for permanent repairs. Transferred to the Royal Canadian Navy whilst under repair, she entered service as HMCS Uganda on 21 October 1944.
Yamato Maru	Japan	World War II: Convoy No. 195: The cargo liner (9,757 GRT) was torpedoed and sunk in the East China Sea (30°18′N 123°35′E) by USS Snook (United States Navy). Twenty-nine passengers and four crewmen were killed.

== 14 September ==
List of shipwrecks: 14 September 1943
Ship	State	Description
Bramora	Norway	World War II: The tanker (6,361 GRT) was torpedoed and sunk in the Indian Ocean south west of Chagos Island (6°10′N 67°37′E) by I-10 (Imperial Japanese Navy) with the loss of all 40 crew, who may have been massacred.
Bushrod Washington	United States	World War II: The Liberty ship was bombed and set on fire at Salerno, Italy, by a German glide bomb dropped by a Luftwaffe aircraft with the loss of seven lives. She blew up and sank the next day.
Giuseppe Sirtori	Regia Marina	World War II: The Giuseppe Sirtori-class torpedo boat was heavily damaged by German aircraft off Corfu and beached. She was blown up by her crew on 25 September.
Grotte de Bethlehem	Vichy France	World War II: The fishing trawler was sunk in the Mediterranean Sea by HMS Upstart (Royal Navy). Her crew were allowed to take to the lifeboats.
H6	Regia Marina	World War II: Seized by the Germans after Italy's surrender to the Allies, the H-class submarine was sunk by German forces at Bonifacio, Corsica.
James W. Marshall	United States	World War II: The Liberty ship was bombed and sunk in the Mediterranean Sea off Salerno with the loss of 63 lives. She was subsequently salvaged and sunk as a blockship in June 1944.
Katsonis	Hellenic Navy	World War II: The Katsonis-class submarine (775 GRT) was sunk in the Aegean Sea off Skiathos (39°15′N 23°21′E) by UJ-2101 (Kriegsmarine). 32 crew were killed, 17 captured and 3 evaded capture.
USS LCT-19	United States Navy	World War II: The LCI-1-class landing craft tank was bombed and sunk off Salerno by a Luftwaffe aircraft.
M 3410 Waalrus	Kriegsmarine	World War II: The minesweeper was torpedoed and sunk in the North Sea off IJmuiden, North Holland, Netherlands by Royal Navy motor torpedo boats.
USS PT-219	United States Navy	World War II: The Higgins 78-foot (23.8 m) patrol torpedo boat sank in Casco Cove (52°49′00″N 173°10′15″E) in Massacre Bay on the coast of Attu Island in the Aleutian Islands during a storm.
TK-95 Sovetskogo Soyuza Fedya Fomin	Soviet Navy	World War II: The G-5-class motor torpedo boat was sunk by M 22 (Kriegsmarine) in the Baltic Sea. Three crewmen were taken as prisoners of war.
Torpille	Vichy France	World War II: The fishing trawler was sunk in the Mediterranean Sea by HMS Upstart (Royal Navy). Her crew were allowed to take to the lifeboats.
Unknown barge	United States	The barge broke free from USS Ute (United States Navy) in heavy weather after leaving Kiska.
HMS Warspite	Royal Navy	World War II: The Queen Elizabeth-class battleship (31,315/36,096 t, 1915) was struck by a Fritz X glide bomb off Altavilla Silentina, Italy, and was severely damaged. She was towed to Malta for temporary repairs, arriving on 19 September. She departed under tow for Gibraltar on 12 November. She sailed to HMNB Rosyth in March 1944. Repairs were completed in June.

== 15 September ==
List of shipwrecks: 15 September 1943
Ship	State	Description
FR 115	Regia Marina	World War II: The Requin-class submarine was scuttled at Genoa.
USS LCT-241	United States Navy	World War II: The LCI-1-class landing craft tank was bombed and sunk off Salerno, Italy.
Ro-101	Imperial Japanese Navy	World War II: The Ro-100-class submarine was depth charged, shelled and sunk in the Coral Sea east of San Cristobal Island (10°57′S 163°56′E) by USS Saufley (United States Navy) and a United States Navy Consolidated PBY Catalina of Squadron VP-23. Lost with all 50 hands.
SAT 20 West	Kriegsmarine	World War II: The heavy gun carrier was sunk by Soviet bombers in the Baltic Sea.

== 16 September ==
List of shipwrecks: 16 September 1943
Ship	State	Description
Graziella	Norway	World War II: The cargo ship (2,137 GRT, 1917) was torpedoed and sunk in the North Sea off the Kvassheim Lighthouse by Bristol Beaufighter aircraft of 489 Squadron, Royal New Zealand Air Force. All crew survived.
Giuseppe Dezza	Regia Marina	World War II: The Rosolino Pilo-class torpedo boat was scuttled at Fiume. She was raised and repaired by the Germans and put in service as TA 35 (Kriegsmarine).
Heisternest	Kriegsmarine	World War II: The Filin-class guard ship was bombed and sunk by US aircraft at Nantes, Loire Atlantique, France.
R 19	Kriegsmarine	World War II: The Type R 17 minesweeper was sunk at Nantes during an American air raid.
M 4461 Hirondelle III	Kriegsmarine	World War II: The minesweeper was sunk at La Pallice, Charente-Maritime, France during an American air raid.
Seikai Maru	Imperial Japanese Navy	World War II: The auxiliary gunboat was sunk by a mine in Kavieng Harbour, New Ireland.
Sperrbrecher 16 Tulane	Kriegsmarine	World War II: The Sperrbrecher was sunk at La Pallice during an American air raid.
Sperrbrecher 184 Bernisse	Kriegsmarine	World War II: The Sperrbrecher (399 GRT, 1941) was sunk at Nantes during an American air raid.
TA4	Kriegsmarine	World War II: The incomplete Le Fier-class torpedo boat was sunk at Nantes during an American air raid.
Uisko	Finnish Navy	World War II: Continuation War: The auxiliary patrol ship was torpedoed and sunk in the Gulf of Finland north of Keri Lighthouse, Keri Island, Estonia, by a Soviet Ilyushin Il-4 aircraft. 18 killed, 2 crewmen rescued.
V 1515 Rothienbaum	Kriegsmarine	World War II: The Vorpostenboot was heavily damaged by fighter bombers and sank off Le Havre, France. V 1513 was damaged by the same attack. Total casualties for both ships were 11 dead and 38 wounded. The ship was later raised and repaired.

== 17 September ==
List of shipwrecks: 17 September 1943
Ship	State	Description
Calbrone, Cavalletta, Cicala, Clava, Grillo, Libellula, Lucciola and Zagaglia	Regia Marina	World War II: The incomplete Gabbiano-class corvettes, captured by the Germans on 13 September, were scuttled in a yard at Castellammare di Stabia when the Germans withdrew from the area.
M 3600 Jacques Coer	Kriegsmarine	World War II: The naval trawler/minesweeper (286 GRT, 1907) struck a mine and sank in the North Sea off Ostend, West Flanders, Belgium.
M 3604 Motor I	Kriegsmarine	World War II: The naval drifter/minesweeper (127 GRT, 1918) struck a mine and sank in the North Sea off Ostend with the loss of two lives.
M 3606 Oceaan VI	Kriegsmarine	World War II: The naval drifter/minesweeper (162 GRT, 1937) was sunk by a mine off Ostend with the loss of 4 lives.
Paula	Germany	World War II: The cargo ship was sunk in the Aegean Sea by HMS Eclipse, HMS Faulknor (both Royal Navy) and Vasilissa Olga (Royal Hellenic Navy).
Pluto	Germany	World War II: The cargo ship (1,156 GRT, 1905) was sunk in the Aegean Sea by HMS Eclipse, HMS Faulknor (both Royal Navy) and Vasilissa Olga (Royal Hellenic Navy).
USS Pompano	United States Navy	World War II: The Porpoise-class submarine was attacked by a Japanese seaplane in the Pacific Ocean off Shiriya. Depth charges dropped by Ashizaki (Imperial Japanese Navy) the next day brought up more oil. Although some sources claim this attack sunk her, others state that she was lost to a mine off Honshū, Japan, on 27 September.
USS PT-136	United States Navy	World War II: The Elco 80' PT boat ran aground off Malai Island in the Vitiaz Strait (05°55′S 148°01′E) and was scuttled.

== 18 September ==
List of shipwrecks: 18 September 1943
Ship	State	Description
Francesco Rismondo	Regia Marina	World War II: The Osvetnik-class submarine (676 GRT) was scuttled off Bonifacio, Corsica, France by the Germans who had captured her on 14 September. There were no casualties.
H 6	Regia Marina	World War II: The Holland 602 type submarine (360 GRT) was scuttled off Bonifacio, Corsica, France by the Germans who had captured her on 14 September. There were no casualties.
Kansai Maru	Imperial Japanese Army	World War II: Convoy O-602A: The Kanto Maru-class auxiliary transport ship (8,614 GRT) was torpedoed in the Bismarck Sea (00°41′N 146°28′E) by USS Scamp (United States Navy), sinking early on 19 September. Twenty-three troops and one crewman were killed. Her captain and 264 survivors were rescued by CH-16 and CH-28 (both Imperial Japanese Navy).
Kinrei Maru	Japan	Convoy No. 197: The cargo ship was driven ashore in a typhoon at Naze, Amami Oshima. Later refloated.
MAL 8	Kriegsmarine	The MAL 1 type landing fire support lighter (140 GRT) was thrown ashore near cape Kazantyp, Azov Sea during a storm. The crew was rescued but the ship could not be recovered and was blown up on 26 September.
MS 45	Regia Marina	World War II: The Lursen E-boat (60 GRT) was scuttled by an Italian sailor at Cattolica, where her crew has left her on 9 September. There were no casualties.
Tomitsu Maru	Japan	The cargo ship was driven ashore in a typhoon at Naze, Amami Oshima. Later refloated.
UJ 2104	Kriegsmarine	World War II: The submarine chaser/naval whaler was shelled and damaged in the Bay of Stampalia by HMS Eclipse, HMS Faulknor (both Royal Navy) and Vasilissa Olga (Hellenic Navy). She was scuttled by her crew at 36°34′N 26°30′E.
Yowa Maru	Japan	World War II: The cargo ship was torpedoed and sunk in the East China Sea north of Formosa by USS Trigger (United States Navy).

== 19 September ==
List of shipwrecks: 19 September 1943
Ship	State	Description
HMS BYMS 2019	Royal Navy	World War II: The YMS-1-class minesweeper (207/270 t, 1942) struck a mine off Crotone, Italy. She was towed to the port but sank during the night. Four crew were killed.
Fort Longueuil	United Kingdom	World War II: The Fort ship (7,128 GRT, 1942) was torpedoed and sunk in the Indian Ocean south west of the Chagos Archipelago (approximately 10°S 68°E) by U-532 (Kriegsmarine) with the loss of 57 of her 59 crew.
Futtsu Maru	Japan	Convoy No. 197: The ship was driven ashore at Amami-O-Shima by a typhoon.
Honan Maru	Japan	Convoy No. 197: The Type 1K standard merchant-class ore carrier was driven ashore at Amami-O-Shima by a typhoon. Refloated and towed by an unknown ship from Convoy 197 to Nagasaki. Repairs finished on 8 April 1944.
Kachisan Maru	Japan	World War II: The cargo ship was torpedoed and sunk in the Pacific Ocean off Honshu by the submarine USS Harder (United States Navy).
Koso Maru	Japan	Convoy No. 197: The cargo ship was driven ashore at Amami-O-Shima by a typhoon. She was refloated and returned to service.
Kyokuyo Maru	Japan	Convoy No. 197: The factory ship (17,549 GRT) was driven ashore and wrecked at Amami-O-Shima (28°20′N 129°30′E) by a typhoon. One crew was lost.
MS 12 and MS 23	Regia Marina	World War II: The MS 11-class E-boats were sunk at Stampalia by German aircraft.
Taketoyo Maru	Japan	Convoy No. 192: The tanker was driven ashore at Amami-O-Shima by a typhoon. Refloated and returned to service by mid October.
Tango Maru	Japan	Convoy No. 197: The government-requisitioned cargo ship was driven ashore at Amami-O-Shima (28°20′N 129°30′E) by a typhoon. Refloated and returned to service by December.
U-341	Kriegsmarine	World War II: The Type VIIC submarine was depth charged and sunk in the Atlantic Ocean (58°34′N 25°30′W) by a Consolidated B-24 Liberator aircraft of 10 Squadron, Royal Canadian Air Force with the loss of all 50 crew.
Villarosa	Italy	World War II: The cargo liner was bombed and sunk by Allied aircraft at Naples. She was refloated in June 1945. Subsequently repaired and returned to service as Taurinia.

== 20 September ==
List of shipwrecks: 20 September 1943
Ship	State	Description
Almenara	United Kingdom	World War II: The cargo ship struck a mine and sank in the Gulf of Taranto 20 to 25 nautical miles (37 to 46 km) south south east of Taranto, Italy with the loss of 41 of the 84 people on board.
Frederick Douglass	United States	World War II: Convoy ON 202: The Liberty ship was torpedoed and damaged in the Atlantic Ocean (57°03′N 28°08′W) by U-238 (Kriegsmarine) and was abandoned by her crew. All 71 people on board were rescued by Rathlin (United Kingdom). Frederick Douglass was later torpedoed and sunk by U-645 (Kriegsmarine).
Katsura Maru No. 2 Go	Imperial Japanese Navy	World War II: The Katsura Maru No. 2 Go-class auxiliary fleet replenishment ship was torpedoed and sunk in the Pacific Ocean (49°05′N 141°45′E) by USS S-28 (United States Navy). Five crewmen were killed.
HMS Lagan	Royal Navy	World War II: Convoy ON 202: The River-class frigate (1,445/2,165 t, 1942) was torpedoed and damaged in the Atlantic Ocean 57°09′N 27°28′W by U-270 (Kriegsmarine) with the loss of 29 crew. She was towed to the United Kingdom by Destiny (United Kingdom) but was declared a constructive total loss.
No. 54	Soviet Navy	The G-5-class motor torpedo boat was lost on this date.
Spalato	Regia Marina	World War II: The incomplete Split-class destroyer was sunk at dock in Split, Yugoslavia by Yugoslav Partizans. Later salvaged by the Germans.
HMCS St. Croix	Royal Canadian Navy	World War II: Convoy ON 202: The Town-class destroyer (1,190/1,590 t, 1919) was torpedoed and sunk in the Bay of Biscay (57°30′N 31°30′W) by U-305 (Kriegsmarine) with the loss of 68 of her 149 crew. The 81 survivors were rescued by HMS Itchen (Royal Navy), but 80 of them would be killed the next day when that ship was sunk by U-666 (Kriegsmarine).
St. Usk	United Kingdom	World War II: The cargo ship (5,472 GRT, 1909) was torpedoed and sunk in the Atlantic Ocean (16°30′S 29°28′W) by U-161 (Kriegsmarine). Her captain was taken as a prisoner of war, the rest of her 51 crew were rescued by Albareda (Spain).
Theodore Dwight Weld	United States	World War II: Convoy ON 202: The Liberty ship was torpedoed and sunk in the Atlantic Ocean 500 nautical miles (930 km) south west of Iceland (57°03′N 28°08′W) by U-238 (Kriegsmarine) with the loss of 12 gunners and 20 crewmen. Survivors were rescued by Rathlin (United Kingdom).
U-338	Kriegsmarine	World War II: The Type VIIC submarine was depth charged and sunk in the Atlantic Ocean by HMCS Drumheller (Royal Canadian Navy) with the loss of all 51 crew.
U-346	Kriegsmarine	The Type VIIC submarine sank in Danzig Bay 54°37′38″N 18°50′26″E in a diving accident with the loss of 37 of her 43 crew.
USS YF-579	United States Navy	The self-propelled covered lighter sprang a leak and sank while under tow off San Francisco, California. Salvage efforts were unsuccessful and the wreck was blown up.

== 21 September ==
List of shipwrecks: 21 September 1943
Ship	State	Description
Antje Fritzen	Germany	World War II: The cargo ship was torpedoed and sunk in the Arctic Sea off the Fischer Peninsula by TKA-21 (Kriegsmarine), or sunk by mine with Soviet motor torpedo boats witnessing the sinking.
Argun Maru	Japan	World War II: Convoy RINJI-B: The cargo ship was torpedoed and sunk in the East China Sea 30 miles (48 km) north of the Hoka Sho light, Formosa (26°33′N 123°10′E) by USS Trigger (United States Navy). Two crew were killed.
Brandenburg	Kriegsmarine	World War II: The minelayer was torpedoed and sunk 7 miles (11 km) northeast of Isola di Capraia, Italy (43°08′N 09°58′E) by HMS Unseen (Royal Navy). 25 crewmen missing and 30 wounded. Survivors rescued by R 189 and R 201 (both Kriegsmarine).
Cornelia P. Spencer	United States	World War II: The Liberty ship was torpedoed and sunk in the Indian Ocean (2°08′N 50°10′E) by U-188 (Kriegsmarine) with the loss of two of her 68 crew. Survivors were rescued by HMS Relentless (Royal Navy), Sandown Castle (United Kingdom) or reached land in their lifeboat.
F 509	Kriegsmarine	The Type C Marinefahrprahm was sunk on this date.
Hokusei Maru	Japan	World War II: The ship was sunk in the Pacific Ocean by USS Wahoo (United States Navy).
Kreta	Kriegsmarine	World War II: The night fighter direction vessel was torpedoed and sunk in the Mediterranean Sea 7 miles (11 km) northeast of Isola di Capraia (43°08′N 09°58′E) by HMS Unseen (Royal Navy). Five crewmen killed, eleven wounded. Survivors were rescued by R 189 and R 201 (both Kriegsmarine).
Nikolaus	Germany	World War II: The cargo ship was torpedoed and sunk by ORP Dzik (Polish Navy) off Bastia, Corsica, France.
HMS Polyanthus	Royal Navy	World War II: Convoys ONS 18/ON 202: The Flower-class corvette (925/1,170 t, 1941) was torpedoed and sunk about 1,000 miles (1,600 km) southwest of Reykjavík (57°00′N 31°10′W) by U-952 Kriegsmarine during convoy escort duty with the loss of all but one of her 86 crew.
StuBo 1088	Kriegsmarine	The StuBo42 type landing craft/motor launch was sunk on this date.
Shiriya	Imperial Japanese Navy	World War II: Convoy RINJI-B: The fleet oiler was torpedoed, exploded and sunk in the East China Sea 30 miles (48 km) north of the Hoka Sho light, Formosa (26°33′N 123°10′E) by USS Trigger (United States Navy).
Shoyo Maru	Imperial Japanese Navy	World War II: Convoy RINJI-B: The transport ship was torpedoed and sunk in the East China Sea 30 miles (48 km) north of the Hoka Sho light, Formosa (26°27′N 122°40′E) by USS Trigger (United States Navy). Five crew were killed.
Tiberiade	France	World War II: The cargo ship capsized and sank in an Allied air raid on Bastia, Corsica.
William W. Gerhard	United States	World War II: Convoy NSS 3: The Liberty ship was torpedoed and damaged in the Tyrrhenian Sea 45 nautical miles (83 km) south of Salerno, Italy (40°05′N 14°43′E) by U-593 (Kriegsmarine) with the loss of two of the 267 people on board. Survivors abandoned ship and were rescued by the convoy's escorts, including USS Symbol, which rescued 124 people. The crew reboarded William W. Gerhard. She was taken in tow by USS Moreno (United States Navy) but a fire broke out and the crew were taken off. Her cargo of ammunition exploded and the ship broke in two, with the bow section sinking. The stern section was scuttled by USS Moreno.

== 22 September ==
List of shipwrecks: 22 September 1943
Ship	State	Description
Andrea Sgarallino	Italy	World War II: The small passenger ship was torpedoed and sunk in the Mediterranean Sea by HMS Uproar (Royal Navy), with the loss of some 300 civilians.
USS APc-35	United States Navy	The coastal transport ran aground off Tetepare Island, Solomon Islands (08°48′S 157°46′E) and was abandoned.
F 420	Kriegsmarine	The Type C Marinefahrprahm was sunk on this date.
HMS Itchen	Royal Navy	World War II: Convoys ONS 18/ON 202: The River-class frigate (1,370/1,920 t, 1942) was torpedoed and sunk in the Atlantic Ocean by U-666 (Kriegsmarine) with The loss of all but one of her crew.
Jenny	Germany	World War II: The coastal tanker was sunk at Nantes, Loire-Inférieure during an American air raid.
Julia Luckenbach	United States	The cargo ship collided with British Resolution (United Kingdom) and sank in the Indian Ocean (34°33′S 22°06′E).
Katsurahama Maru	Japan	World War II: The coaster was torpedoed and sunk in the East China Sea by USS Snook (United States Navy).
Lydia	Romania	World War II: The barge was sunk by a mine in the Black Sea. Raised, but not repaired.
M-51	Soviet Navy	The M-class submarine sank in the Black Sea off Ochemiri in a diving accident. She was raised on 25 September, repaired, and returned to service in 1944.
HMT Ocean Retriever	Royal Navy	World War II: The naval trawler (95 GRT, 1912) struck a mine and sank in the Thames Estuary with the loss of all eleven crew.
Richard Olney	United States	World War II: The Liberty ship struck a mine and was damaged in the Mediterranean Sea (37°25′N 9°54′E). She was towed to Bizerta, Algeria but was declared a constructive total loss. Two crew were killed.
Rovigno	Italy	World War II: The passenger ship was torpedoed and sunk by British MTB 89 at the pier in Vlorë, Albania.
SNS-786	Romania	World War II: The lighter was sunk by a mine in the Black Sea.
Sperone	Italy	World War II: The tugboat was sunk by a German mine off Taranto. They were 97 dead and 51 survivors.
U-229	Kriegsmarine	World War II: The Type VIIC submarine was depth charged, shelled, rammed and sunk in the Atlantic Ocean south east of Cape Farewell, Greenland (54°36′N 36°25′W) by HMS Keppel (Royal Navy) with the loss of all 50 crew.

== 23 September ==
List of shipwrecks: 23 September 1943
Ship	State	Description
Daisin Maru	Japan	World War II: The tanker was torpedoed and sunk in the Pacific Ocean south of Honshu (34°15′N 137°00′E) by USS Harder (United States Navy).
Dithmarschen	Germany	World War II: The cargo ship was torpedoed and sunk in the Aegean Sea by Allied aircraft.
Gaetano Donizetti	Germany	World War II: The troopship was shelled and sunk in the Aegean Sea by the destroyer HMS Eclipse (Royal Navy) with the loss of at least 1,576 lives, most of them Italian prisoners.
Ermland	Germany	World War II: The tanker was sunk at Nantes, Loire-Inférieure, France during an American air raid.
FL 08 Notre Dame de Laghet	Kriegsmarine	The naval trawler was lost on this date.
Fort Jemseg	United Kingdom	World War II: Convoy ON 202: The Fort ship (7,134 GRT, 1942) was torpedoed and sunk in the Atlantic Ocean (53°18′N 40°24′W) by U-238 (Kriegsmarine) with the loss of one of her 53 crew. Survivors were rescued by Romulus (Norway) and HMT Northern Foam (Royal Navy).
Kertosono	Germany	World War II: The cargo liner (9,289 GRT) was bombed by Allied aircraft at Nantes and was burnt out.
Kowa Maru	Japan	World War II: The cargo ship was torpedoed and sunk in the Pacific Ocean off Honshu by USS Harder (United States Navy).
Kulmerland	Kriegsmarine	World War II: The supply ship was bombed and sunk at Nantes during an American Air raid. Raised in 1946, and scrapped in 1950 at Briton Ferry, United Kingdom. Also reported as Tokyo Maru (Japan).
M-119	Kriegsmarine	World War II: The Type 1915 minesweeper was scuttled in Italy.
Oregon Express	Norway	World War II: Convoy ON 202: The cargo ship (3,642 GRT, 1933) was torpedoed and sunk in the Atlantic Ocean (53°40′N 39°50′W) by U-238 (Kriegsmarine) with the loss of eight of her 45 crew. Survivors were rescued by Kingman (Panama) and Romulus (Norway).
R 30	Kriegsmarine	World War II: The R-25-class minesweeper was sunk in the Black Sea off Kerch, Soviet Union by Soviet aircraft.
R 93	Kriegsmarine	World War II: The minesweeper struck a mine and sank in the North Sea off Dunkerque Nord, France.
Ryotoku Maru	Imperial Japanese Navy	World War II: Convoy 3916: The Ryotoku-class auxiliary transport ship was torpedoed and sunk in the Surigao Strait, or about 135 nautical miles (250 km; 155 mi) west of Urracas (Farallon de Pajaros), northern Marianas by USS Trout (United States Navy).
SG 2	Kriegsmarine	World War II: The Sans Souci-class sloop was bombed and sunk at Nantes by Allied aircraft with the loss of two lives.
Skjelbred	Norway	World War II: Convoy ON 202: The tanker (5,096 GRT, 1937) was torpedoed and sunk in the Atlantic Ocean (53°18′N 40°24′W by U-238 (Kriegsmarine). All 43 crew were rescued by HMT Northern Foam (Royal Navy).
Steel Voyager	United States	World War II: Convoys ONS 18/ON 202: The cargo ship was torpedoed and sunk in the Atlantic Ocean (53°18′N 40°24′W) by U-952 (Kriegsmarine). All 66 crew were rescued by HMCS Morden (Royal Canadian Navy) and Renoncule (Free French Naval Forces).
Saint Nazaire	Germany	World War II: The cargo ship was torpedoed and sunk in the Mediterranean Sea off Corsica (44°13′N 9°13′E) by HMS Sibyl (Royal Navy). There were 38 dead and 21 survivors.
TA10	Kriegsmarine	World War II: The La Melpomène-class torpedo boat was heavily damaged by HMS Eclipse (Royal Navy) off Rhodes. She was scuttled on 27 September in Prassas Bay.
Vieste	Regia Marina	World War II: The captured Crotone-class minelayer was scuttled by the Germans.
Wangerland	Germany	World War II: The tanker was sunk at Nantes during an American air raid.
Yamashiro Maru	Imperial Japanese Army	World War II: Convoy 3916: The transport was torpedoed and sunk in the Surigao Strait, or about 135 nautical miles (250 km; 155 mi) west of Urracas (Farallon de Pajaros), northern Marianas, by USS Trout (United States Navy) with the loss of four crewmen and seven passengers.

== 24 September ==
List of shipwrecks: 24 September 1943
Ship	State	Description
Elias Howe	United States	World War II: The Liberty ship was torpedoed and sunk in the Gulf of Aden 75 nautical miles (139 km) south east of Aden (11°35′N 45°50′E) by I-10 (Imperial Japanese Navy) with the loss of 2 crew. The 58 survivors were rescued by HMS Aiglon (Royal Navy) and a seaplane.
F 217	Kriegsmarine	World War II: The Type A Marinefahrprahm was heavily damaged by Soviet aircraft in Kerch. She was not repaired and finally scuttled in November 1943. There were no casualties.
Francesco Stocco	Regia Marina	World War II: The Giuseppe Sirtori-class torpedo boat was sunk by German aircraft off Corfu with the loss of 103 crew.
HMS LCA 675	Royal Navy	The landing craft assault (9/12 t, 1943) was lost on this date.
HMS MMS 70	Royal Navy	World War II: The MMS-class minesweeper (225/295 t, 1942) was sunk by a mine in the Gulf of Taranto with the loss of 10 crew.
Mostun	Norway	World War II: The cargo ship struck a mine and sank in Gulenfjord, Norway. She was raised the next day, repaired and returned to service.
Trapez I	Kriegsmarine	World War II: The cargo ship was torpedoed by Dzik (Polish Navy) and HMS Ultor (Royal Navy) 11 nautical miles (20 km) north east of Bastia, Corsica, Italy and was beached south of Bastia. She was torpedoed on 2 September by HMS Uproar (Royal Navy) and was a total loss.

== 25 September ==
List of shipwrecks: 25 September 1943
Ship	State	Description
Azuchi Maru	Imperial Japanese Navy	The Yatsushiro Maru-class naval trawler/auxiliary storeship disappeared without a trace with her 24 crew between Kusai and Nauru, possibly a maritime hazard.
DB-18	Soviet Navy	The No. 1-class landing boats was lost.
DB-31	Soviet Navy	The No. 1-class landing boats was lost.
HMT Donna Nook	Royal Navy	World War II: The 132-foot (40 m), 307-ton minesweeping naval trawler (307 GRT, 1916) was rammed and sunk in the North Sea off Harwich, Essex by HMT Stella Rigel (Royal Navy) while engaging Kriegsmarine E-boats and maneuvering to pick up survivors of HMT Franc Tireur (Royal Navy). All crew were rescued by HMT Stella Rigel (Royal Navy).
Dubac	Italy	World War II: The cargo ship was evacuating Italian troops from Albania when she bombed by German aircraft in the Strait of Otranto and ran aground to avoid sinking. More than 200 men were killed. The wreck sank some days later and was scrapped after the war.
HMT Franc Tireur	Royal Navy	World War II: The minesweeping naval trawler (314 GRT, 1916) was torpedoed and sunk in the North Sea off Harwich by S 96 (Kriegsmarine) with the loss of 15 of 30 crew.
Kirishima Maru	Imperial Japanese Navy	World War II: Convoy SA-12: The Kirishima Maru-class auxiliary oiler was torpedoed and sunk in the South China Sea (09°53′N 112°10′E) by USS Bowfin (United States Navy). 14 crew were killed. Her captain and 61 crew rescued by CH-19 (Imperial Japanese Navy).
LS 6	Kriegsmarine	The LS 2-class light schnellboot was lost on this date.
Moliere	Kriegsmarine	The auxiliary river minesweeper was sunk on this date.
Monsun	Germany	World War II: The tanker was sunk at Nantes, Loire-Inférieure, France during an American air raid.
MS 21	Regia Marina	World War II: The MS 11-class E-boat was scuttled at Gatea.
Nordstern	Germany	World War II: The ship was sunk at Nantes during an American air raid.
Probitas	Italy	World War II: The cargo ship was bombed and sunk in the Adriatic Sea off Santi Quaranta, Albania by Luftwaffe aircraft. She was on a voyage from Santi Quaranta to Brindisi.
S 96	Kriegsmarine	World War II: The E-boat was rammed and damaged in the North Sea off the Sunk Lightship (United Kingdom) by HMML 145 and HMML 150 (both Royal Navy) and was abandoned. Thirteen crew were rescued by HMML 145 and taken as prisoners of war.
San Pablo	Panama	The cargo ship was sunk as a target in the Gulf of Mexico nine nautical miles (17 km; 10 mi) southeast of the Pensacola Pass (30°11′N 87°13′W). Wreck eventually dispersed with explosives.
USS Skill	United States Navy	World War II: The Auk-class minesweeper was torpedoed and sunk in the Gulf of Salerno (40°20′N 14°35′E) by U-593 (Kriegsmarine) with the loss of 72 of her 103 crew. Survivors were rescued by USS Speed (United States Navy).
Taiko Maru	Japan	World War II: The cargo ship was torpedoed and sunk in the Pacific Ocean by USS Pompano and USS Wahoo (both United States Navy).
V 316	Kriegsmarine	World War II: The Ekwator-class Vorpostenboot was torpedoed by British aircraft in the North Sea off Camperdown, and either beached, or sunk, off Den Helder, North Holland.

== 26 September ==
List of shipwrecks: 26 September 1943
Ship	State	Description
Christian Michelsen	Norway	World War II: Convoy UGS 17: The cargo ship (7,176 GRT, 1943) was torpedoed and sunk in the Mediterranean Sea (37°12′N 8°26′E) by U-410 (Kriegsmarine) with the loss of 47 of the 50 people on board.
DB-13	Soviet Navy	The No. 1-class landing boat was lost.
DB-28	Soviet Navy	The No. 1-class landing boat was lost.
DB-38	Soviet Navy	The No. 1-class landing boat was lost.
Ellinico Horio	Germany	World War II: The coaster was seized during the night by its Greek crew and Italian prisoners of war and tried to escape. She was sunk by German aircraft off Karpathos with no survivors.
Hildegard	Germany	World War II: The cargo ship was torpedoed and sunk in the Baltic Sea off Ventspils, Latvia by a Soviet Ilyushin Il-4 aircraft.
HMS Intrepid	Royal Navy	World War II: The I-class destroyer (1,370/1,888 t, 1937) was bombed and sunk at Leros, Greece by Junkers Ju 88 aircraft of the Luftwaffe with the loss of 15 crew. Survivors were rescued by HMML 354, HMML 356 and HMML 836 (all Royal Navy).
Itapagé	Brazil	World War II: The cargo liner was torpedoed and sunk in the Atlantic Ocean (10°05′S 35°54′W) by U-161 (Kriegsmarine) with the loss of 22 of the 107 people on board.
Kasasagi	Imperial Japanese Navy	World War II: The Ōtori-class torpedo boat was torpedoed and sunk in the Flores Sea (05°00′S 121°57′E) by USS Bluefish (United States Navy).
MAS 534	Regia Marina	World War II: The MAS 526-class MAS boat was sunk off Leros by German aircraft.
RA 267	Kriegsmarine	World War II: The VAS 231-class submarine chaser was scuttled by the Germans after they captured her earlier in the month.
RA 268	Kriegsmarine	World War II: The VAS 231-class submarine chaser was scuttled by the Germans after they captured her earlier in the month.
UJ 2218 Tadorna	Kriegsmarine	The submarine chaser ran aground near Ardenza, Italy, and was wrecked.
Vasilissa Olga	Hellenic Navy	World War II: The G-class destroyer was bombed and sunk at Leros by Junkers Ju 88 aircraft of the Luftwaffe with the loss of 72 of her 145 crew. Survivors were rescued by HMML 354, HMML 356 and HMML 836 (all Royal Navy).

== 27 September ==
List of shipwrecks: 27 September 1943
Ship	State	Description
Arare Maru	Imperial Japanese Army	World War II: Operation Jaywick: The tanker was mined and sunk by Australian Commandos using limpet mines at Singapore. One crewman was killed. She was raised, repairs finished 28 December, and returned to service.
Champagne	Germany	World War II: The tanker was torpedoed and sunk in the Mediterranean Sea off Corsica by HMS Ultor, HMS Uproar (both Royal Navy) and ORP Dzik (Polish Navy).
Elsi	Germany	World War II: The transport ship (1,433 GRT, 1891) was sailing from Piraeus to Argostoli to pick up Italian prisoners of war where she hit a mine south of Cephalonia and sank. There were no casualties.
Enrico Cosenz	Regia Marina	World War II: The torpedo boat, a former La Masa-class destroyer, was scuttled on 27 September off in the Adriatic Sea off Lastovo after suffering damage in a collision on 25 September and in a German air raid earlier on 27 September.
Fuji Maru	Japan	World War II: The cargo ship was bombed and sunk off Wewak, New Guinea by American aircraft.
Hakusan Maru	Imperial Japanese Army	World War II: Operation Jaywick: The Taiyei Maru-class auxiliary transport (2,197 GRT 1920), being used as a tanker, was mined and sunk by Australian Commandos using limpet mines at Singapore (01°18′N 103°52′E).
Jungingen	Kriegsmarine	World War II: The R boat tender, a converted Type 1916 minesweeper, was torpedoed and sunk in the English Channel southwest of Berck-sur-Mer, Pas-de-Calais, France, when here convoy was attacked by Dutch and British MTB and SGB. 23 crew were killed.
Kashima Maru	Japan	World War II: Convoy No. 324: The Imperial Japanese Army transport was torpedoed and sunk in the Pacific Ocean (31°35′N 127°47′E) by USS Bonefish (United States Navy). 139 troops/passengers and one crew were killed.
Kiri Maru	Japan	World War II: The cargo ship was bombed and sunk off Wewak by American aircraft.
Kizan Maru	Imperial Japanese Army	World War II: Operation Jaywick: The Kizan Maru-class auxiliary transport was mined and sunk by Australian Commandos using limpet mines at Singapore. One crew member was killed. The wreck was broken up in July 1944.
M 4616	Kriegsmarine	The minesweeper ran aground at Aberwrac'h, Finistère, France and was wrecked.
Madali	Germany	World War II: The cargo ship was torpedoed and sunk in the English Channel south west of Berck-sur-Mer (50°22′03″N 1°04′02″E) by HMMTB 202, HMMTB 204, HMMTB 231, HMSGB 4 Grey Fox (all Royal Navy) with the loss of 52 lives.
No. 24	Soviet Navy	The G-5-class motor torpedo boat was lost on this date.
Sakihana Maru	Japan	World War II: The cargo ship was bombed and sunk off Wewak by American aircraft.
Taisei Maru	Japan	World War II: Convoy Wewak No.9: The transport ship was bombed and sunk north of Wewak by American aircraft. Six gunners and seven crew were killed.
Taisho Maru	Japan	World War II: The cargo ship was bombed and sunk off Wewak by American aircraft.
U-161	Kriegsmarine	World War II: The Type IXC submarine was depth charged and sunk in the Atlantic Ocean (12°30′S 35°35′W) by Martin PBM Mariner aircraft of the United States Navy with the loss of all 53 crew and one survivor from St Usk (United Kingdom) who had been taken aboard as a prisoner of war.
U-221	Kriegsmarine	World War II: The Type VIIC submarine was depth charged and sunk in the Atlantic Ocean (approximately 47°00′N 18°00′W) by a Handley Page Halifax aircraft of 58 Squadron, Royal Air Force with the loss of all 50 crew.
V 1501 Wiking 7	Kriegsmarine	World War II: The Vorpostenboot/naval whaler was torpedoed and sunk in the English Channel off Cap d'Antifer, Seine-Inférieure, France by HMMGB 108 HMMGB 117 and HMMGB 118 (all Royal Navy).
V 5705 Elsaß	Kriegsmarine	World War II: The Vorpostenboot/naval whaler struck a mine and sank in the Norwegian Sea off Bodø, Norway with the loss of 19 crew.

== 28 September ==
List of shipwrecks: 28 September 1943
Ship	State	Description
Akashi Maru	Japan	World War II: The cargo ship was torpedoed and sunk in the Pacific Ocean by USS Bluefish (United States Navy).
Ardena	Kriegsmarine	World War II: The passenger ferry (1,092 GRT, 1915), a former Azalea-class sloop, was sailing from Cephalonia to Greece with 840 Italian prisoners of war when she hit a mine off Argostoli and sank. 720 Italian prisoners of war were killed.
USS Cisco	United States Navy	World War II: The Balao-class submarine was bombed, depth charged and sunk in the Sulu Sea west of Negros, Philippines (9°47′N 121°44′E) by Japanese aircraft and Karatsu (Imperial Japanese Navy).
Giulio Germanico	Regia Marina	World War II: The 94% complete Capitani Romani-class cruiser was scuttled by the Germans at Castellammare di Stabia. Raised and completed 1953–1955 and put in Italian Navy service as San Marco.
Hoko	Imperial Japanese Navy	World War II: The Hirashima-class minelayer was bombed and sunk 20 nautical miles (37 km) east of Buka, Bouganville (05°00′S 154°30′E) by American aircraft.
HMS LCP(R) 1019	Royal Navy	The landing craft, personnel (ramped) was lost on this date.
KATSh-155	Soviet Navy	World War II: The auxiliary minesweeping boat was sunk in the Black Sea by S 28, S 42, S 45 and S 49 (all Kriegsmarine).
Nord-Vest	Soviet Navy	World War II: The sail auxiliary minesweeping boat was sunk in the Black Sea by S 28, S 42, S 45 and S 49 (all Kriegsmarine).
Taian Maru	Japan	World War II: The cargo ship was torpedoed and sunk in the Pacific Ocean southwest of Anatahan Island, Marianas, by USS Gudgeon (United States Navy) with the loss of 60 lives (46 passengers and 14 crew).
VAS 205	Kriegsmarine	World War II: The VAS 205-class submarine chaser was scuttled by the Germans off Ischia Island after capturing her earlier in the month. She was raised post-war, repaired and returned to service.

== 29 September ==
List of shipwrecks: 29 September 1943
Ship	State	Description
Banffshire	United Kingdom	World War II: The cargo ship (6,479 GRT, 1912) was torpedoed and sunk in the Arabian Sea north west of the Maldive Islands (9°26′N 71°20′E) by U-532 (Kriegsmarine) with the loss of one of her 100 crew. Survivors were rescued by HMS Rajputana (Royal Navy).
Dunay II	Soviet Union	World War II: The lighter was torpedoed and sunk in the Black Sea by U-20 (Kriegsmarine).
Danaiskaya 2	Soviet Union	World War II: The barge was sunk by mines in the Tuganrog Gulf. 182 crew and passengers killed.
USS LCT-342	United States Navy	The LCT-1-class landing craft tank was lost by grounding off Salerno, Italy.
Masaki Maru No. 2	Japan	World War II: The cargo ship was torpedoed and sunk in the Pacific Ocean by USS Wahoo (United States Navy).

== 30 September ==
List of shipwrecks: 30 September 1943
Ship	State	Description
Arkhangel'sk	Soviet Union	World War II: Convoy VA 18: The cargo ship was torpedoed and sunk in the Kara Sea west of Russkij Island (76°54′N 92°29′E) by U-960 (Kriegsmarine) with the loss of seventeen of her 42 crew. Survivors were rescued by T-886 (Soviet Navy).
Dea Mazzella	Germany	World War II: The cargo ship was shelled and sunk in the Adriatic Sea south of Šebenik, Yugoslavia by Yugoslav shore-based artillery.
HMS LCT 2231	Royal Navy	World War II: The LCT-5-class landing craft tank (9/12 t, 1943) was lost as cargo aboard HMS LST 79 (Royal Navy) when she was sunk at Ajaccio, Corsica, France. There were no casualty.
HMS LST 79	Royal Navy	World War II: The LST-1-class landing ship tank (1,625/4,080 t, 1943) was sunk by German aircraft at Ajaccio. Four crew were killed and another died of his wounds 15 days later. Seven RAF radar personnel were also probably killed in this attack.
M 7022 Hummer	Kriegsmarine	World War II: The minesweeper, a converted Heilbutt-class patrol ship, was torpedoed and sunk in the Mediterranean Sea east of Bastia by HMS Sibyl (Royal Navy).
Maebashi Maru	Imperial Japanese Army	World War II: Convoy SO-805: The Lyons Maru-class transport was torpedoed and sunk in the Pacific Ocean 373 nautical miles (691 km) east south east of Palau (01°00′N 139°28′E) by USS Pogy (United States Navy). A total of 1,389 troops, thirteen gunners, and 48 crew were killed.
Sanct Svithun	Norway	World War II: The passenger ship (1,376 GRT, 1927) was bombed and sunk off the Stad Peninsula, Norway, by Bristol Beaufighter aircraft of 404 Squadron Royal Canadian Air Force. Between 19 and 20 Norwegian crew, 22 and 26 Norwegian passengers and 10 and 20 German soldiers lost their lives.
USCGC Wilcox	United States Navy	The patrol vessel foundered in a gale off of Nags Head, North Carolina. One crew was lost, 37 survived.
Züllchow 17	Germany	World War II: The lighter was torpedoed and sunk in the Baltic Sea off Steinort by a Soviet Ilyushin Il-4 aircraft.

== Unknown date ==
List of shipwrecks: Unknown date 1943
Ship	State	Description
Acqui	Italy	World War II: The cargo ship was scuttled at La Spezia. She was subsequently raised by the Germans, repaired and entered Kriegsmarine service as the minelayer Niedersachsen.
Ancona	Italy	World War II: The cargo ship was sunk as a blockship at Savona by the Germans. She was floated in 1946 and scrapped.
Caio Mario	Regia Marina	World War II: The Capitani Romani-class cruiser was scuttled at La Spezia.
Duilio	Italy	World War II: The passenger ship was scuttled at Trieste. She was subsequently salvaged and taken in to German service.
HMS Gallant	Royal Navy	World War II: The G-class destroyer was scuttled as a blockship at St Paul's Island, Malta.
USS Grayling	United States Navy	World War II: The Tambor-class submarine was sunk by enemy action in the South China Sea between 9 and 12 September with the loss of all 60 crew.
K-1	Soviet Navy	World War II: The K-class submarine was lost in the Kara Sea between 9 and 21 September.
USS LCT-209	United States Navy	World War II: The LCT Mk 5-class landing craft tank was destroyed at Salerno, Italy by the explosion of Bushrod Washington (United States) on 15 September 1943 during the Battle of Salerno, or lost off Normandy, France, on 10 or 19 June 1944.
Mont Agel	France	World War II: The cargo ship was bombed and sunk at Bastia, Corsica. The wreck was scrapped in 1947.
Re Alessandro	Italy	World War II: The cargo ship was driven ashore near Patras, Greece. She was subsequently shelled by land-based artillery and was consequently declared a total loss.
SG 22	Kriegsmarine	World War II: The Élan-class corvette was scuttled at Livorno. She was scrapped in 1946.
Sileno	Italy	World War II: The cargo ship was sunk at Naples by the Germans. She was refloated in 1948 and scrapped.
Ugo Botti	Regia Marina	World War II: The coaster was scuttled by partisans at Split to prevent capture by the Germans. Raised by Yugoslavia in November 1944, repaired and returned to service in 1945 as Knin.
Volodda	Italy	World War II: The cargo ship was scuttled at Bari. She was refloated in 1947, repaired and returned to service.
