= French submarine Dauphin =

Three submarines of the French Navy have borne the name Dauphin:

- French submarine Dauphin (1911), an experimental submarine launched as X and renamed in 1911
- French submarine Dauphin (1925), a Requin-class submarine launched in 1925 and scuttled in 1943
- French submarine Dauphin (S633), a Narval-class submarine launched in 1958 and stricken in 1992
