= French submarine Phoque =

Two submarines of the French Navy have borne the name Phoque:

- French submarine Phoque (1904), a Naïade-class submarine launched in 1904 and stricken in 1914
- French submarine Phoque (1926), a Requin-class submarine launched in 1926, acquired by Italy in 1942 and sunk in 1943
