= Phoque =

Phoque is the French term for pinnipeds. It may also refer to:

- Ile des Phoques, a rugged granite island, with an area of 8 ha in south-eastern Australia
- Phoque, the name of two French submarines
