= German submarine U-952 =

German World War II submarine

History

Nazi Germany
- Name: U-952
- Ordered: 10 April 1941
- Builder: Blohm & Voss, Hamburg
- Yard number: 152
- Laid down: 1 February 1942
- Launched: 14 October 1942
- Commissioned: 10 December 1942
- Decommissioned: 12 July 1944
- Fate: Broken up in 1946

General characteristics
- Class & type: Type VIIC submarine
- Displacement: 769 tonnes (757 long tons) surfaced; 871 t (857 long tons) submerged
- Length: 67.10 m (220 ft 2 in) o/a; 50.50 m (165 ft 8 in) pressure hull
- Beam: 6.20 m (20 ft 4 in) o/a; 4.70 m (15 ft 5 in) pressure hull
- Draught: 4.74 m (15 ft 7 in)
- Installed power: 2,800–3,200 PS (2,100–2,400 kW; 2,800–3,200 bhp) (diesels); 750 PS (550 kW; 740 shp) (electric)
- Propulsion: 2 shafts; 2 × diesel engines; 2 × electric motors
- Speed: 17.7 knots (32.8 km/h; 20.4 mph) surfaced; 7.6 knots (14.1 km/h; 8.7 mph) submerged
- Range: 8,500 nmi (15,700 km; 9,800 mi) at 10 knots (19 km/h; 12 mph) surfaced; 80 nmi (150 km; 92 mi) at 4 knots (7.4 km/h; 4.6 mph) submerged
- Test depth: 230 m (750 ft); Crush depth: 250–295 m (820–968 ft)
- Complement: 4 officers, 40–56 enlisted
- Armament: 5 × 53.3 cm (21 in) torpedo tubes (four bow, one stern); 14 × torpedoes or 26 TMA mines; 1 × 8.8 cm (3.46 in) deck gun (220 rounds); 1 × twin 2 cm (0.79 in) C/30 anti-aircraft gun

Service record
- Part of: 5th U-boat Flotilla; 10 December 1942 – 30 April 1943; 3rd U-boat Flotilla; 1 May 1943 – 31 January 1944; 29th U-boat Flotilla; 1 February – 12 July 1944
- Identification codes: M 49 527
- Commanders: Oblt.z.S. / Kptlt. Oskar Curio; 10 December 1942 – 12 July 1944
- Operations: 5 patrols: 1st patrol: a. 27 April – 31 May 1943; b. 2 August 1943; c. 26 August – 5 September 1943; 2nd patrol: 6 September – 23 October 1943; 3rd patrol: a. 11 – 15 December 1943; b. 16 December 1943 – 15 January 1944; 4th patrol: a. 17 February – 20 March 1944; b. 3 – 7 May 1944; 5th patrol: 8 May – 21 June 1944
- Victories: 2 merchant ships sunk (13,374 GRT); 1 warship sunk (925 tons); 1 merchant ship damaged (7,176 GRT)

German submarine U-952 was a Type VIIC U-boat built for Nazi Germany's Kriegsmarine for service during World War II. She was laid down on 1 February 1942 by Blohm & Voss, Hamburg as yard number 152, launched on 14 October 1942 and commissioned on 10 December 1942 under Oberleutnant zur See Oskar Curio.

== Design ==
German Type VIIC submarines were preceded by the shorter Type VIIB submarines. U-952 had a displacement of 769 tonnes (757 long tons) when at the surface and 871 tonnes (857 long tons) while submerged. She had a total length of 67.10 m (220 ft 2 in), a pressure hull length of 50.50 m (165 ft 8 in), a beam of 6.20 m (20 ft 4 in), a height of 9.60 m (31 ft 6 in), and a draught of 4.74 m (15 ft 7 in). The submarine was powered by two Germaniawerft F46 four-stroke, six-cylinder supercharged diesel engines producing a total of 2,800 to 3,200 metric horsepower (2,060 to 2,350 kW; 2,760 to 3,160 shp) for use while surfaced, two Brown, Boveri & Cie GG UB 720/8 double-acting electric motors producing a total of 750 metric horsepower (550 kW; 740 shp) for use while submerged. She had two shafts and two 1.23 m (4 ft) propellers. The boat was capable of operating at depths of up to 230 metres (750 ft).

The submarine had a maximum surface speed of 17.7 knots (32.8 km/h; 20.4 mph) and a maximum submerged speed of 7.6 knots (14.1 km/h; 8.7 mph). When submerged, the boat could operate for 80 nautical miles (150 km; 92 mi) at 4 knots (7.4 km/h; 4.6 mph); when surfaced, she could travel 8,500 nautical miles (15,700 km; 9,800 mi) at 10 knots (19 km/h; 12 mph). U-952 was fitted with five 53.3 cm (21 in) torpedo tubes (four fitted at the bow and one at the stern), fourteen torpedoes, one 8.8 cm (3.46 in) SK C/35 naval gun, 220 rounds, and one twin 2 cm (0.79 in) C/30 anti-aircraft gun. The boat had a complement of between forty-four and sixty.

== Service history ==
The boat's career began with training at 5th U-boat Flotilla on 10 December 1942, followed by active service on 1 May 1943 as part of the 3rd Flotilla for the next seven months. On 1 February 1944 she transferred to serve with 29th Flotilla, based in La Spezia, for Mediterranean operations.

In five patrols she sank two merchant ships, for a total of 13,374 gross register tons (GRT), as well as one warship and also damaged a merchant ship.

=== Wolfpacks ===
U-952 took part in five wolfpacks, namely:

- Without name (5 – 10 May 1943)
- Isar (10 – 15 May 1943)
- Donau 1 (15 – 26 May 1943)
- Leuthen (15 – 24 September 1943)
- Rossbach (27 September – 6 October 1943)

=== Fate ===
U-952 was decommissioned on 12 July 1944 after being badly damaged on 5 July 1944 by US air raid. Her wreck was captured by French and broken up in 1946.

=== Previously recorded fate ===
U-952 was sunk on 6 August 1944 in the Military port of Toulon, France, in position 43°07′N 05°55′E, during an air raid by US Liberator bombers.

== Summary of raiding history ==
Date	Ship Name	Nationality	Tonnage (Note: Merchant ship tonnages are in gross register tons. Military vessels are listed by tons displacement.)	Fate
21 September 1943	HMS Polyanthus	Royal Navy	925	Sunk
23 September 1943	Steel Voyager	United States	6,198	Sunk
23 September 1943	James Gordon Bennett	United States	7,176	Damaged
10 March 1944	William B. Woods	United States	7,176	Sunk

== See also ==
- Mediterranean U-boat Campaign (World War II)

== Bibliography ==
- Busch, Rainer; Röll, Hans-Joachim (1999). German U-boat commanders of World War II : a biographical dictionary. Translated by Brooks, Geoffrey. London, Annapolis, Md: Greenhill Books, Naval Institute Press. ISBN 1-55750-186-6.
- Busch, Rainer; Röll, Hans-Joachim (1999). Der U-Boot-Krieg, 1939-1945: Deutsche U-Boot-Verluste von September 1939 bis Mai 1945 [German U-boat losses from September 1939 to May 1945] (in German). Vol. IV. Hamburg, Berlin, Bonn: Mittler. ISBN 3-8132-0514-2.
- Edwards, Bernard (1996). Dönitz and the Wolf Packs - The U-boats at War. Cassell. pp. 105–107, 117, 123, 124, 189. ISBN 0-304-35203-9.
- Gröner, Eric; Jung, Dieter; Maass, Martin (1991). German Warships 1815-1945: U-boats and Mine Warfare Vessels. Vol. 2. Translated by Thomas, Keith; Magowan, Rachel. London: Conway Maritime Press. ISBN 0-85177-593-4.
- Sharpe, Peter (1998). U-Boat Fact File. Great Britain: Midland Publishing. ISBN 1-85780-072-9.
