= French submarine Caïman =

French submarine

Caïman
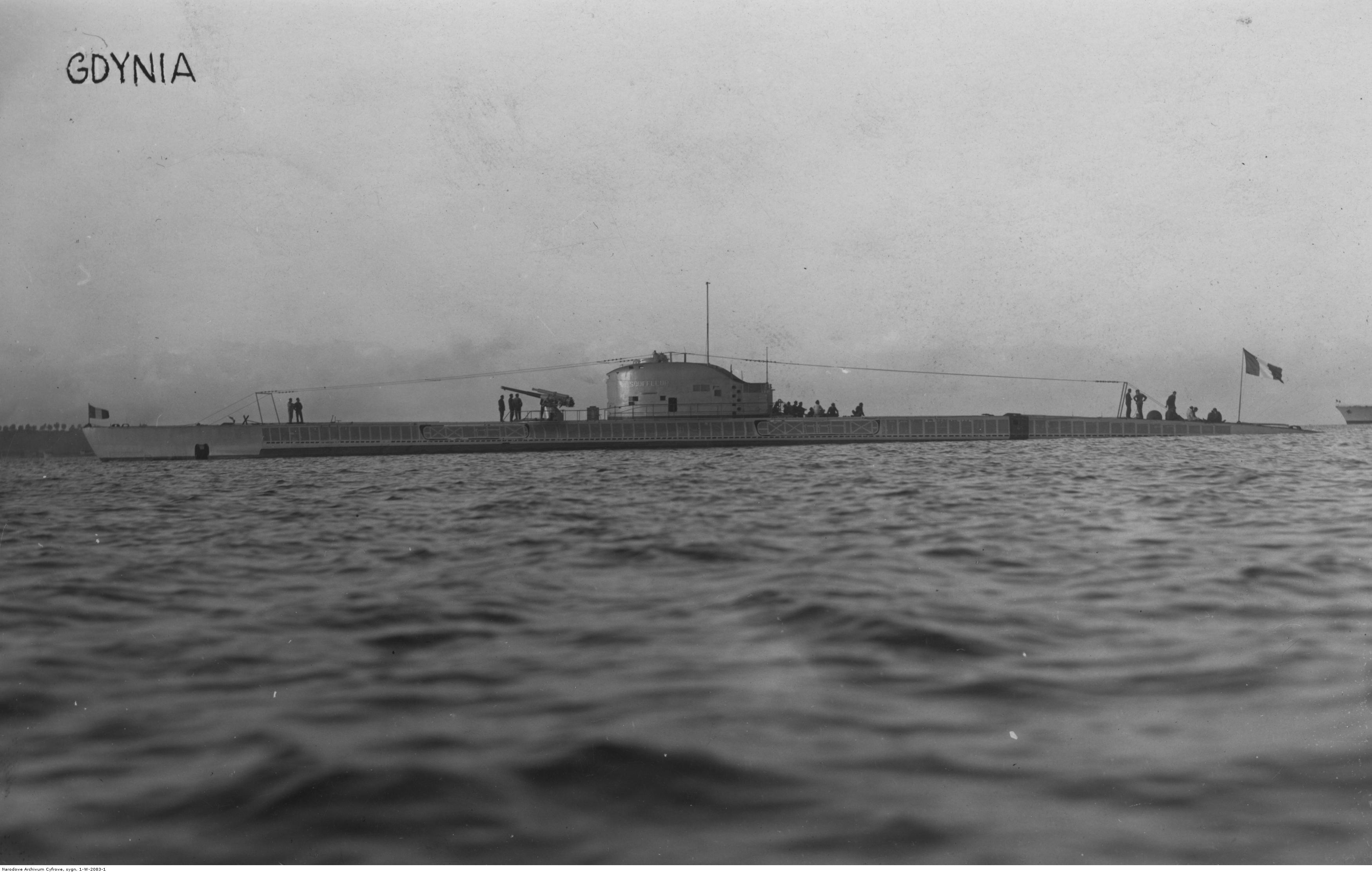
- Sister ship Souffleur in 1926

History

France
- Name: Caïman
- Builder: Arsenal de Cherbourg
- Laid down: 11 August 1924
- Launched: 3 March 1927
- Commissioned: 7 February 1928
- Fate: Scuttled at Toulon on 27 November 1942 to prevent her capture by the Germans, raised in February 1943. Sunk 11 March 1944 by Allied aircraft

General characteristics
- Class & type: Requin-class submarine
- Displacement: 1,150 long tons (1,168 t) (surfaced); 1,441 long tons (1,464 t) (submerged)
- Length: 78 m (255 ft 11 in)
- Beam: 6.8 m (22 ft 4 in)
- Draught: 5.10 m (16 ft 9 in)
- Propulsion: 2 × diesel engines, 2,900 hp (2,163 kW); 2 × electric motors, 1,800 hp (1,342 kW)
- Speed: 15 knots (28 km/h) (surfaced); 9 knots (17 km/h) (submerged)
- Range: 7,700 nautical miles (14,300 km) at 9 knots (17 km/h); 70 nautical miles (130 km) at 5 knots (9.3 km/h) (submerged)
- Test depth: 80 m (260 ft)
- Complement: 51
- Armament: 10 × 550 mm (21.7 in) torpedo tubes; 1 × 100 mm (3.9 in) deck gun; 2 × 8 mm (0.31 in) machine guns

The French submarine Caïman was a Requin-class submarine built for the French Navy in the mid-1920s. Laid down in August 1924, it was launched in March 1927 and commissioned in February 1928. On 9 June, Caïman narrowly missed the British light cruiser HMS Ajax off Syria. It was scuttled at Toulon on 27 November 1942 to prevent her capture by the Germans, then raised in February 1943. It was sunk again on 11 March 1944 by Allied aircraft.

== Design ==
78 m (255 ft 11 in) long, with a beam of 6.8 m (22 ft 4 in) and a draught of 5.1 m (16 ft 9 in), Requin-class submarines could dive up to 80 m (260 ft). The submarine had a surfaced displacement of 1,150 long tons (1,168 t) and a submerged displacement of 1,441 long tons (1,464 t). Propulsion while surfaced was provided by two 2,900 hp (2,163 kW) diesel motors and two 1,800 hp (1,342 kW) electric motors. The submarines' electrical propulsion allowed it to attain speeds of 9 knots (17 km/h; 10 mph) while submerged and 15 knots (28 km/h; 17 mph) on the surface. Their surfaced range was 7,700 nautical miles (14,300 km) at 9 knots (17 km/h), and 4,000 nautical miles (7,400 km) at 12 knots (22 km/h), with a submerged range of 70 nautical miles (130 km) at 5 knots (9.3 km/h).
