= USS Speed =

Minesweeper of the United States Navy

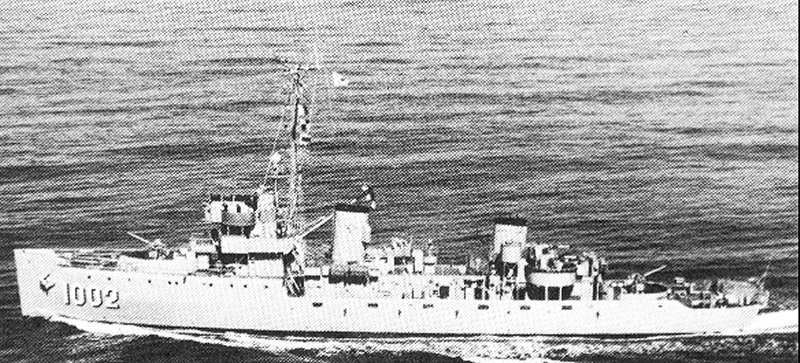

History

United States
- Name: USS Speed
- Builder: American Ship Building Company, Cleveland, Ohio
- Laid down: 17 November 1941
- Launched: 18 April 1942
- Commissioned: 15 October 1942
- Decommissioned: 7 June 1946
- Reclassified: MSF-116, 7 February 1955
- Honours and awards: 7 battle stars (World War II)
- Fate: Transferred to the Republic of Korea, 17 November 1967

History

South Korea
- Name: ROKS Sunchon (PCE-1002)
- Acquired: 17 November 1967
- Fate: Unknown

General characteristics
- Class & type: Auk-class minesweeper
- Displacement: 890 long tons (904 t)
- Length: 221 ft 3 in (67.44 m)
- Beam: 32 ft (9.8 m)
- Draft: 10 ft 9 in (3.28 m)
- Speed: 18 knots (33 km/h; 21 mph)
- Complement: 100 officers and enlisted
- Armament: 1 × 3"/50 caliber gun; 2 × 40 mm guns; 4 × 20 mm guns; 4 × Depth charge projectors; 1 × Hedgehog anti-submarine mortar; 2 × Depth charge tracks

USS Speed (AM-116) was an Auk-class minesweeper acquired by the United States Navy for the dangerous task of removing mines from minefields laid in the water to prevent ships from passing.

Speed was laid down at Cleveland, Ohio, on 17 November 1941 by the American Ship Building Company, launched on 18 April 1942, and commissioned on 15 October 1942.

== World War II Mediterranean operations ==
Departing Cleveland, Ohio on 15 November, Speed proceeded to Boston, Massachusetts, where she arrived on 8 December. During the next three months, she conducted shakedown and training along the Atlantic Coast from Casco Bay, Maine, to Norfolk, Virginia, before departing New York on 19 March 1943 for the Mediterranean. As escort for an eastbound convoy, she sailed via Bermuda and arrived at Tunis, Tunisia, on 13 April.

Assigned to Mine Division 17, Speed conducted coastal patrols off the coast of Algeria during the next two months. On 5 July, she departed Mers El Kébir, Algeria, and joined Vice Admiral H. Kent Hewitt's Western Naval Task Force for the invasion of Sicily. Steaming with ships of Task Force 85, she closed the Sicilian coast off Scoglitti on 10 July and served as a control ship during amphibious assaults.

Following the invasion, Speed swept waters along the southern and western coasts of Sicily. After sweeping off Palermo, she escorted supply convoys between Tunisia and Sicily from 10 to 23 August. On 25 August, she sailed for Algeria and arrived at Oran on the 29th to prepare for the invasion of Italy.

== Invasion of Italy operations ==
As a unit of Rear Admiral J. L. Hall's Southern Attack Force, Speed departed Oran on 5 September and arrived off the Gulf of Salerno late on 8 September. She swept channels during the landings the next day and operated in the Gulf of Salerno on mine and antisubmarine patrols until 26 September. While on patrol on the 25th, she rescued survivors of Skill (AM-115) after that minesweeper had been fatally hit by an enemy torpedo.

Speed departed Salerno on 26 September and escorted a convoy of merchant ships to Bizerte, Tunisia. Interspersed with minesweeping and ASW patrols, she performed escort duties during the next nine months as she screened supply and reinforcement convoys from North Africa to Sicily and Italy. While steaming in convoy from Oran to Bizerte on 20 April 1944, she helped repulse a determined German air attack which sank three ships, including Lansdale (DD-426).

After returning to Naples on 20 June, Speed operated in the Gulf of Salerno until 7 August preparing for the invasion of southern France. Assigned to Task Force 87, she departed Salerno on 12 August and escorted an LCI convoy to the assault area off Fréjus and St. Raphael. She closed the French coast early on 15 August and served as a glide bomb "jam ship" and in the ASW screen during amphibious landings. She operated along the French coast during the next few weeks, sweeping channels and clearing harbors from Fréjus to Toulon.

== Stateside overhaul ==
After two escort runs to North Africa, she departed Oran for the United States on 24 November and arrived at Norfolk, Virginia on 11 December to begin a two-month overhaul.

== Pacific Ocean operations ==
Speed departed Norfolk, Virginia, on 15 March 1945 for mine-sweeping duty in the western Pacific. Steaming via the Panama Canal and San Diego, California, she reached Pearl Harbor on 31 May. Between 11 June and 12 July, she steamed to Okinawa via the Marshall Islands and Marianas Islands. Assigned to Mine Squadron Six, she swept the waters of the Ryūkyūs during the closing weeks of World War II.

== Post-World War II operations ==
After the end of hostilities, she departed Okinawa on 1 September for sweeping operations along the coast of Japan. Arriving at Kagoshima, Kyūshū, on 3 September, she swept Kagoshima Wan and Van Diemen Strait before returning to Okinawa on 13 September.

During the remainder of 1945, Speed continued minesweeping operations in support of the Allied occupation of Japan. Her duties carried her to Bungo Suido and the Inland Sea, as well as to the East China Sea and waters off Formosa.

== Decommissioning ==
She returned to the United States early in 1946, was decommissioned on 7 June, and entered the Pacific Reserve Fleet at San Diego, California. She was reclassified MSF-116 on 7 February 1955. On 17 November 1967, Speed was transferred to the Republic of Korea, and she served the South Korean Navy as Sunchon (PCE-1002).

== Awards ==
Speed received seven battle stars for World War II service.
