= French submarine Espadon (1926) =

Espadon
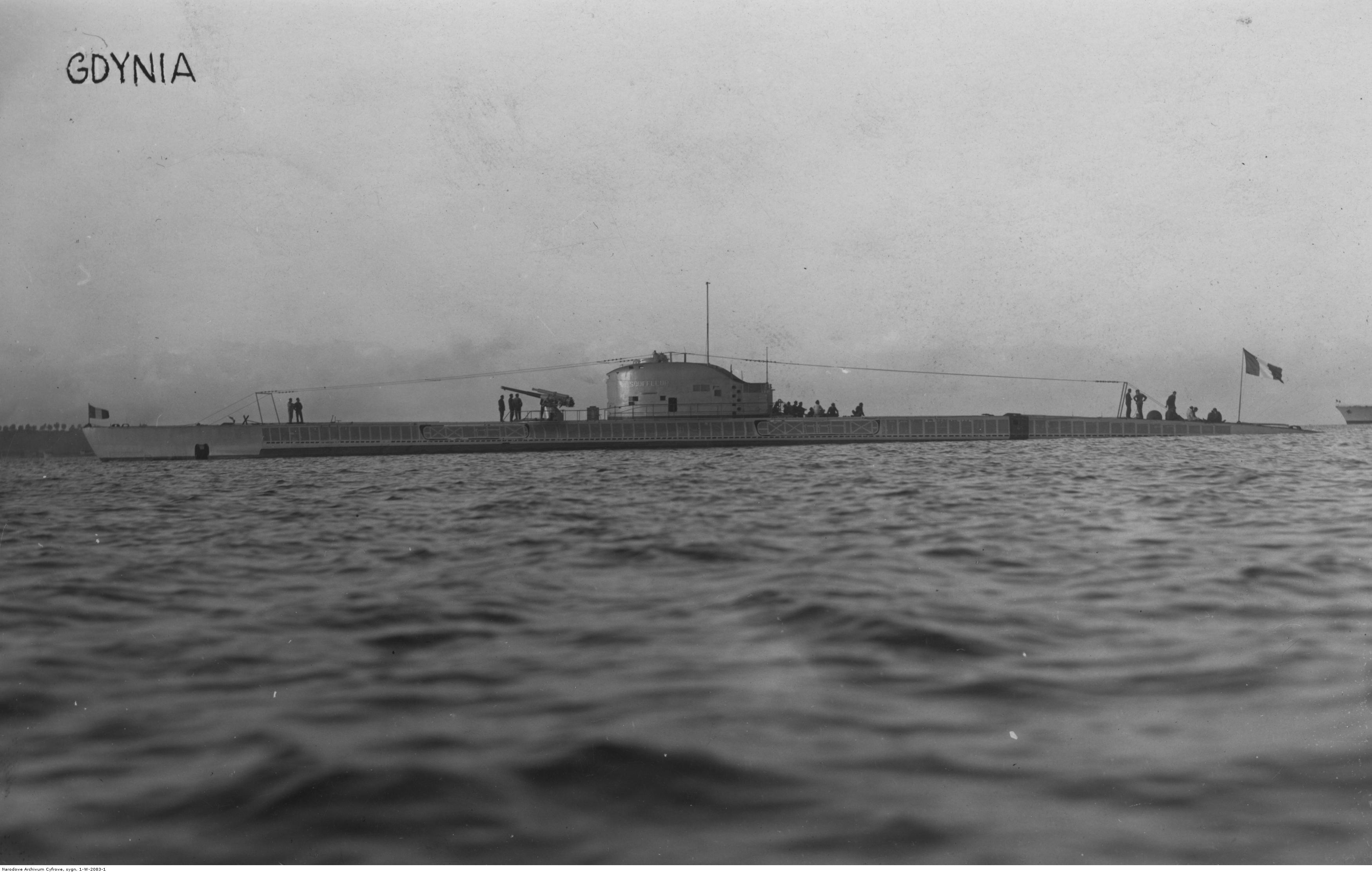
- Sister ship Souffleur in 1926

History

France
- Name: Espadon
- Builder: Arsenal de Toulon
- Laid down: 1 October 1923
- Launched: 29 May 1926
- Commissioned: 16 December 1927
- Fate: Captured by Italian forces on 8 December 1942

Italy
- Name: FR 114
- Acquired: 8 December 1942
- Fate: Scuttled by at the Castellamare shipyard on 13 September 1943, then raised by German forces in 1943 but not repaired.

General characteristics
- Class & type: Requin-class submarine
- Displacement: 1,150 long tons (1,168 t) (surfaced); 1,441 long tons (1,464 t) (submerged)
- Length: 78.30 m (256 ft 11 in)
- Beam: 6.84 m (22 ft 5 in)
- Draught: 5.10 m (16 ft 9 in)
- Propulsion: 2 × diesel engines, 2,900 hp (2,163 kW); 2 × electric motors, 1,800 hp (1,342 kW)
- Speed: 15 knots (28 km/h) (surfaced); 9 knots (17 km/h) (submerged)
- Range: 7,700 nautical miles (14,300 km) at 9 knots (17 km/h); 70 nautical miles (130 km) at 5 knots (9.3 km/h) (submerged)
- Test depth: 80 m (260 ft)
- Complement: 51
- Armament: 10 × 550 mm (21.7 in) torpedo tubes; 1 × 100 mm (3.9 in) deck gun; 2 × 8 mm (0.31 in) machine guns

The French submarine Espadon was a Requin-class submarine built for the French Navy in the mid-1920s. Laid down in October 1923, it was launched in May 1926 and commissioned in December 1927. It was disarmed at Bizerte, Tunisia in April 1941 and captured there by Italian forces on 8 December 1942 and renamed FR 114. It was scuttled by the Italians at the Castellamare shipyard on 13 September 1943, then raised by the Germans in 1943 but not repaired.

== Design ==
78 m (255 ft 11 in) long, with a beam of 6.8 m (22 ft 4 in) and a draught of 5.1 m (16 ft 9 in), Requin-class submarines could dive up to 80 m (260 ft). The submarine had a surfaced displacement of 1,150 long tons (1,168 t) and a submerged displacement of 1,441 long tons (1,464 t). Propulsion while surfaced was provided by two 2,900 hp (2,163 kW) diesel motors and two 1,800 hp (1,342 kW) electric motors. The submarines' electrical propulsion allowed it to attain speeds of 9 knots (17 km/h; 10 mph) while submerged and 15 knots (28 km/h; 17 mph) on the surface. Their surfaced range was 7,700 nautical miles (14,300 km) at 9 knots (17 km/h), and 4,000 nautical miles (7,400 km) at 12 knots (22 km/h), with a submerged range of 70 nautical miles (130 km) at 5 knots (9.3 km/h).
