= French submarine Phoque (1926) =

French Requin-class submarine

Phoque
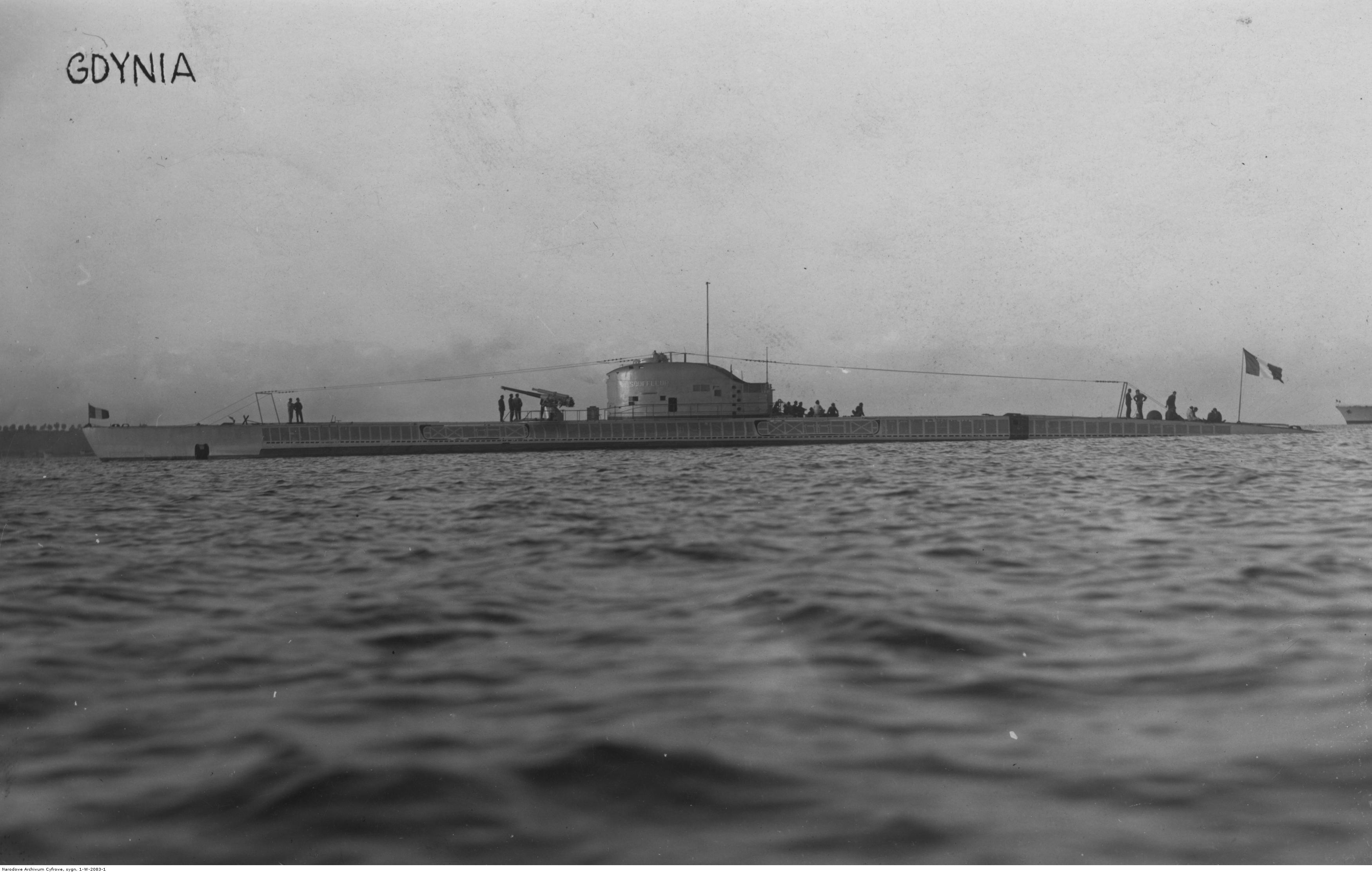
- Sister ship Souffleur in 1926

History

France
- Name: Phoque
- Builder: Brest Arsenal
- Laid down: 21 May 1924
- Launched: 16 March 1926
- Commissioned: 7 May 1928
- Fate: Seized by Axis forces on the 8th of December, 1942

Italy
- Name: FR 111
- Acquired: the 8th of December, 1942
- Fate: Sunk by Allied aircraft 28 February 1943 off the Italian coast

General characteristics
- Class & type: Requin-class submarine
- Displacement: 1,150 long tons (1,168 t) (surfaced); 1,441 long tons (1,464 t) (submerged)
- Length: 78.30 m (256 ft 11 in)
- Beam: 6.84 m (22 ft 5 in)
- Draught: 5.10 m (16 ft 9 in)
- Propulsion: 2 × diesel engines, 2,900 hp (2,163 kW); 2 × electric motors, 1,800 hp (1,342 kW)
- Speed: 15 knots (28 km/h) (surfaced); 9 knots (17 km/h) (submerged)
- Range: 7,700 nautical miles (14,300 km) at 9 knots (17 km/h); 70 nautical miles (130 km) at 5 knots (9.3 km/h) (submerged)
- Test depth: 80 m (260 ft)
- Complement: 51
- Armament: 10 × 550 mm (21.7 in) torpedo tubes; 1 × 100 mm (3.9 in) deck gun; 2 × 8 mm (0.31 in) machine guns

Phoque was a Requin-class submarine built for the French Navy in the mid-1920s. Laid down in May 1924, it was launched in March 1926 and commissioned in May 1928. In April 1941, it was disarmed at Bizerte, Tunisia and captured there by the Italians on 8 December 1942 and renamed FR 111. It was sunk on 28 February 1943 10 miles off of Murro di Porco, Sicily by Allied aircraft.

== Design ==
78 m (255 ft 11 in) long, with a beam of 6.8 m (22 ft 4 in) and a draught of 5.1 m (16 ft 9 in), Requin-class submarines could dive up to 80 m (260 ft). The submarine had a surfaced displacement of 1,150 long tons (1,168 t) and a submerged displacement of 1,441 long tons (1,464 t). Propulsion while surfaced was provided by two 2,900 hp (2,163 kW) diesel motors and two 1,800 hp (1,342 kW) electric motors. The submarines' electrical propulsion allowed it to attain speeds of 9 knots (17 km/h; 10 mph) while submerged and 15 knots (28 km/h; 17 mph) on the surface. Their surfaced range was 7,700 nautical miles (14,300 km) at 9 knots (17 km/h), and 4,000 nautical miles (7,400 km) at 12 knots (22 km/h), with a submerged range of 70 nautical miles (130 km) at 5 knots (9.3 km/h).

== Construction and career ==
Phoque was laid down at the Brest Arsenal on 21 May 1924, launched on 16 March 1926 and commissioned on 7 May 1928. In April 1941, it was disarmed at Bizerte, Tunisia and captured there by the Italians on 8 December 1942 and renamed FR 111. It was sunk on 28 February 1943 10 miles off Murro di Porco, Sicily by Allied aircraft.
