= HMS Parthian (N75) =

Submarine of the Royal Navy

- HMS Parthian

History

United Kingdom
- Name: HMS Parthian
- Builder: Chatham Dockyard
- Laid down: 30 June 1928
- Launched: 22 June 1929
- Commissioned: 13 January 1931
- Identification: Pennant number N75
- Nickname(s): Peanut
- Fate: Sunk in the Mediterranean Sea between 28 July and 11 August 1943

General characteristics
- Class & type: Parthian-class submarine
- Displacement: 1,475 long tons (1,499 t) surfaced; 2,040 long tons (2,073 t) submerged
- Length: 260 ft (79 m)
- Beam: 28 ft (8.5 m)
- Draught: 13 ft 8 in (4.17 m)
- Propulsion: Diesel-electric; 2 Admiralty diesel engines, 4,400 hp (3,300 kW); 2 Electric motors, 1,530 hp (1,140 kW); 2 shafts
- Speed: 17.5 knots (20.1 mph; 32.4 km/h) surfaced; 9 kn (10 mph; 17 km/h) submerged
- Range: 8,500 nmi (15,700 km) at 10 kn (12 mph; 19 km/h)
- Complement: 59
- Armament: 8 × 21 inch (533 mm) torpedo tubes (6 bow, 2 stern); 1 × 4 in (102 mm) deck gun; 2 × machine guns

HMS Parthian was the lead boat of the six Royal Navy Parthian-class submarines, all launched in 1929. The submarine was sunk in 1943 during the Second World War. The submarine was nicknamed Peanut, from the identity letters PN painted on the fin.

== Service history ==
Parthian spent most of her Second World War service in the Mediterranean. On the outbreak of the war, she was on the China Station, but was transferred to Alexandria in May 1940. She sank the Diamante near Tobruk on 20 June 1940. By the end of the year she had been attached to the 8th Submarine Flotilla based at Malta.

She also sank the Vichy French submarine Souffleur off Beirut on 25 June 1941, during the combined British/Free French campaign to occupy Syria and Lebanon. Parthian underwent a refit in the United States from late 1941 until March 1942 before returning to the Mediterranean, where she carried out supply operations between July and October to Malta carrying aviation fuel and ammunition. To increase her cargo capacity, one of the batteries was removed and no spare torpedoes were carried. In May 1943 the submarine sank a number of Italian sailing vessels in the Aegean Sea.

The submarine left Malta on 22 July 1943 for a patrol in the southern Adriatic. She was diverted to a patrol area off Otranto on 26 July, and diverted again on 28 July. The submarine was signalled on 6 August to leave the patrol area but the signal was not acknowledged. Parthian failed to arrive at Beirut, where she was due on 11 August. It is likely that she was sunk by a naval mine near Brindisi.

One crewmember lost with Parthian was Timothy Walker, the son of Captain Frederic John "Johnny" Walker, a leading U-boat hunter.
