= Requin-class submarine =

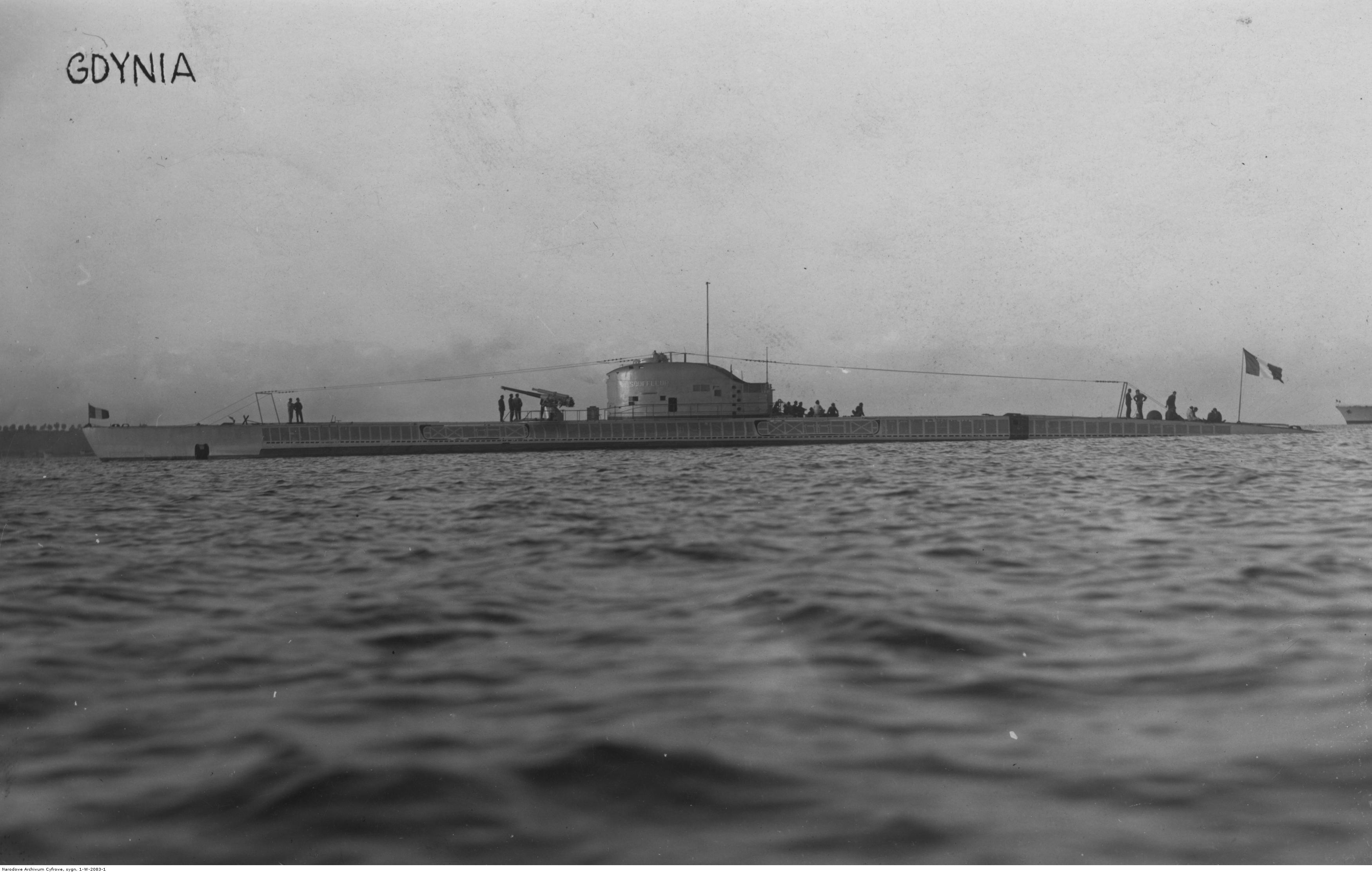
- Souffleur in 1926

Class overview
- Name: Requin class
- Operators: French Navy; Free French Naval Forces; Vichy French Navy
- Succeeded by: Redoutable class
- Built: 1923–1928
- In service: 1926–1946
- Completed: 9
- Lost: 7
- Retired: 2

General characteristics
- Type: Submarine
- Displacement: 1,150 long tons (1,168 t) (surfaced); 1,441 long tons (1,464 t) (submerged)
- Length: 78.30 m (256 ft 11 in)
- Beam: 6.84 m (22 ft 5 in)
- Draught: 5.10 m (16 ft 9 in)
- Propulsion: 2 × diesel engines, 2,900 hp (2,163 kW); 2 × electric motors, 1,800 hp (1,342 kW)
- Speed: 15 knots (28 km/h) (surfaced); 9 knots (17 km/h) (submerged)
- Range: 7,700 nautical miles (14,300 km) at 9 knots (17 km/h); 70 nautical miles (130 km) at 5 knots (9.3 km/h) (submerged)
- Test depth: 80 m (260 ft)
- Complement: 51
- Armament: 10 × 550 mm (21.7 in) torpedo tubes; 1 × 100 mm (3.9 in) deck gun; 2 × 8 mm (0.31 in) machine guns

The Requin-class submarines were a class of nine diesel-electric attack submarines built for the French Navy in the mid-1920s. Most saw action during World War II for the Vichy French Navy or the Free French Naval Forces. Nine ships of this type were built in the shipyards of Brest, Cherbourg and Toulon between 1923 and 1928. The class was part of the French Marine Nationale, serving in the Mediterranean Sea. All member ships took part in World War II, fighting on both sides of the conflict; Four were captured by Italian forces and sunk by the Allies. Only one ship survived the war - Marsouin, decommissioned shortly after the war's end.

== Design ==
The Requin class was ordered as part of the French fleet's expansion program during 1922 and 1923. The class was designed with additional experience gained from examining of ex-German U-boats received as war reparations. The ships were destined for reconnaissance and service in colonies, to attack the shipping lanes of the potential enemies. The class had a large range and diving depth; it suffered, however, from poor maneuverability and speed on the surface. The ships were designed by Jean-Jacques Roquebert.

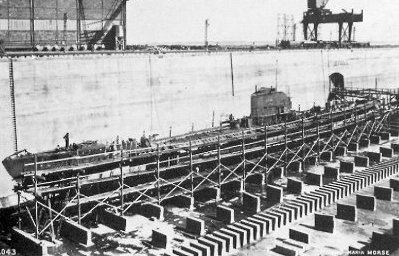
Morse under construction in the Arsenal de Cherbourg, 1924

78 m (255 ft 11 in) long, with a beam of 6.8 m (22 ft 4 in) and a draught of 5.1 m (16 ft 9 in), Requin-class submarines could dive up to 80 m (260 ft). The submarine had a surfaced displacement of 1,150 long tons (1,168 t) and a submerged displacement of 1,441 long tons (1,464 t). Propulsion while surfaced was provided by two 2,900 hp (2,163 kW) diesel motors built by the Swiss manufacturer Sulzer or by Schneider and two 1,800 hp (1,342 kW) electric motors. The submarines' electrical propulsion allowed it to attain speeds of 9 knots (17 km/h; 10 mph) while submerged and 15 knots (28 km/h; 17 mph) on the surface. Their surfaced range was 7,700 nautical miles (14,300 km) at 9 knots (17 km/h), and 4,000 nautical miles (7,400 km) at 12 knots (22 km/h), with a submerged range of 70 nautical miles (130 km) at 5 knots (9.3 km/h).

Of the nine Requin-class ships, two were built in Brest, five in Cherbourg and two in Toulon. The ships were laid down between 1923 and 1924, launched between 1924 and 1927 and were commissioned in the French Navy between 1926 and 1928. The units received the pennant numbers Q115 to Q120 and Q127 through Q129.

== Ships ==
Requin-class submarines
Name	Launched	Commissioned	Fate
Caïman	3 March 1927	7 February 1928	Scuttled at Toulon with the French fleet; refloated by Italian forces and sunk by Allied aircraft.
Dauphin	2 April 1925	22 November 1927	Captured by Italian forces then recaptured by German forces and later scuttled.
Espadon	28 May 1926	16 December 1927	Captured by Italian forces and later scuttled.
Marsouin	27 December 1924	7 September 1927	Used operationally by the Free French Forces from 1942, sold for scrap in 1946.
Morse	11 November 1925	10 February 1928	Sunk by a mine on 16 June 1940.
Narval	9 May 1925	23 July 1926	Used by the Free French Forces, sunk by a mine off Tunisia in 1940.
Phoque	16 March 1926	7 May 1928	Captured by Italian forces; sunk by Allied aircraft off Sicily on 28 February 1943.
Requin	19 July 1924	26 May 1926	Captured by Italian forces and later recaptured by German forces; scrapped in 1944.
Souffleur	1 October 1924	10 August 1926	Sunk by the British submarine HMS Parthian off Beirut.

== Service ==
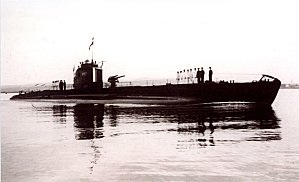
Morse, 1939

From 1935 to 1937, all ships underwent a major overhaul. At the outbreak of World War II, the ships served in the Mediterranean Sea, forming part of the 4th Submarine Flotilla stationed at Bizerte. After the Armistice was concluded between France and Germany, all ships except Morse, sunk off Tunisia on June 16, 1940, and Narval, which went to the Free French Naval Forces, joined the Vichy French navy. On June 25, 1941, during Operation Exporter, Souffleur was torpedoed and sunk off Beirut, Lebanon, by the British submarine Parthian. On November 27, 1942, during the scuttling of the French fleet in Toulon, Caïman was scuttled, later raised by the Italians and on March 11, 1944, sunk again by American planes. Marsouin was not scuttled and escaped from Toulon to join the Free French Naval Forces and served until 1946.

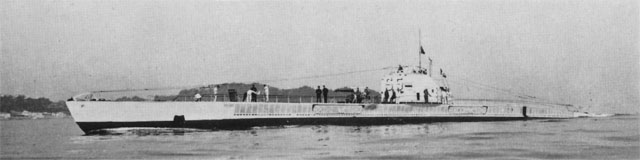
Morse

On 8 December 1942 in Bizerte, German forces captured four ships of the Requin class: Phoque, Requin, Espadon and Dauphin, and then handed them over to Italy. In commission with the Regia Marina, they received the designations FR. 111, FR.113, FR.114 and FR.115, respectively, and were rebuilt into submarine transports. Torpedo and artillery armaments were removed from the ships, leaving only two 13.2 mm guns; they were able to transport 50 tons of cargo and 145 tons of fuel. Only the rebuilding of Phoque (FR.111) was completed, but during its first voyage under the Italian flag on February 28, 1943, the ship was sunk near Syracuse by American planes. After the conclusion of the ceasefire with Italy by the Allies, the remaining ships were scuttled in September 1943 by Italians or Germans.
