= French submarine Dauphin (1925) =

Dauphin
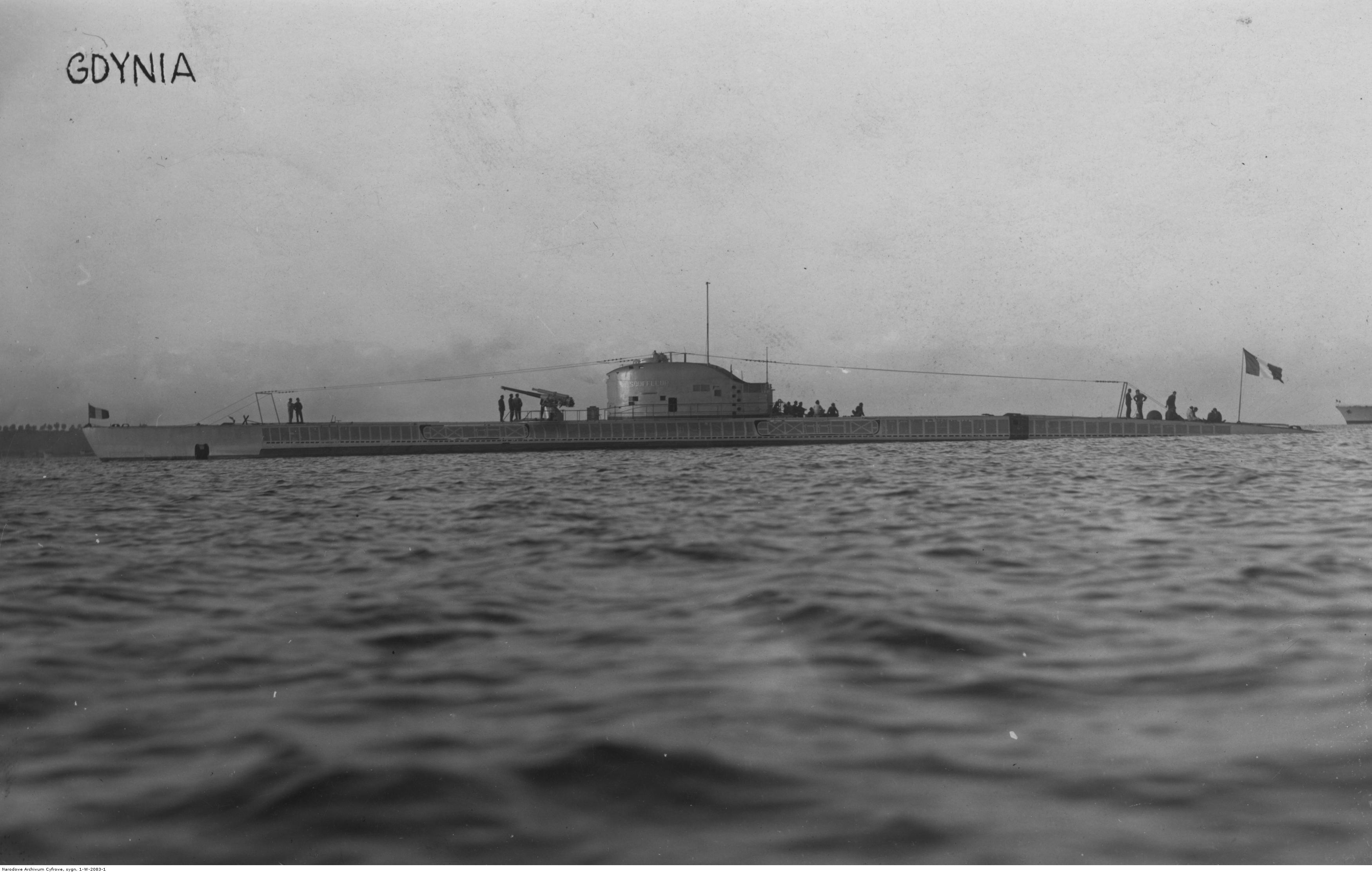
- Sister ship Souffleur in 1926

History

France
- Name: Dauphin
- Namesake: Dolphin
- Builder: Arsenal de Toulon
- Laid down: 11 December 1922
- Launched: 2 April 1925
- Commissioned: 22 November 1927
- Fate: Captured by Italian forces on 8 December 1942 and renamed FR 115; captured by German forces on 9 September 1943. Scuttled on 15 September 1943.

Italy
- Name: FR 115
- Acquired: 8 December 1942
- Fate: Recaptured by the Germans on 9 September 1943, then scuttled on 15 September 1943

General characteristics
- Class & type: Requin-class submarine
- Displacement: 1,150 long tons (1,168 t) (surfaced); 1,441 long tons (1,464 t) (submerged)
- Length: 78.30 m (256 ft 11 in)
- Beam: 6.84 m (22 ft 5 in)
- Draught: 5.10 m (16 ft 9 in)
- Propulsion: 2 × diesel engines, 2,900 hp (2,163 kW); 2 × electric motors, 1,800 hp (1,342 kW)
- Speed: 15 knots (28 km/h) (surfaced); 9 knots (17 km/h) (submerged)
- Range: 7,700 nautical miles (14,300 km) at 9 knots (17 km/h); 70 nautical miles (130 km) at 5 knots (9.3 km/h) (submerged)
- Test depth: 80 m (260 ft)
- Complement: 51
- Armament: 10 × 550 mm (21.7 in) torpedo tubes; 1 × 100 mm (3.9 in) deck gun; 2 × 8 mm (0.31 in) machine guns

The French submarine Dauphin was a Requin (French for shark)-class submarine built for the French Navy in the mid-1920s. Laid down in December 1922, it was launched in April 1925 and commissioned in November 1927. It was captured by Italian forces on 8 December 1942 and renamed FR 115. It was later recaptured by the Germans on 9 September 1943, then scuttled on 15 September 1943. The name Dauphin comes from the French word for Dolphin.

== Design ==
78 m (255 ft 11 in) long, with a beam of 6.8 m (22 ft 4 in) and a draught of 5.1 m (16 ft 9 in), Requin-class submarines could dive up to 80 m (260 ft). The submarine had a surfaced displacement of 1,150 long tons (1,168 t) and a submerged displacement of 1,441 long tons (1,464 t). Propulsion while surfaced was provided by two 2,900 hp (2,163 kW) diesel motors and two 1,800 hp (1,342 kW) electric motors. The submarines' electrical propulsion allowed it to attain speeds of 9 knots (17 km/h; 10 mph) while submerged and 15 knots (28 km/h; 17 mph) on the surface. Their surfaced range was 7,700 nautical miles (14,300 km) at 9 knots (17 km/h), and 4,000 nautical miles (7,400 km) at 12 knots (22 km/h), with a submerged range of 70 nautical miles (130 km) at 5 knots (9.3 km/h).

== Career ==
Dauphin served in the Mediterranean and, after the Armistice of 22 June 1940, was under the control of the Vichy government. In December 1942, she was taken over by the Germans in Bizerte and transferred to Italy. In the Regia Marina, Dauphin received the designation FR 115. After Italy had concluded a ceasefire with the Allies, the ship was taken over by the Germans in Pozzuoli in September 1943 and then scuttled.
