= Velimir Škorpik =

- Born: 2 April 1919; Brodarica near Zadar, Kingdom of Italy
- Died: Early October 1943 or 7 November 1943 (aged 24); Zagorje near Posušje, Independent State of Croatia
- Military career
- Allegiance: Kingdom of Yugoslavia (1940–1941); Independent State of Croatia (1941); Yugoslav Partisans (1941–1943)
- Branch: Navy (1940–43); Ground forces (1943)
- Service years: 1940–1943
- Rank: poručnik korvete (Corvette Lieutenant) in 1941 (Note: Multiple sources such as Simović (1990), Trgo (1959, p. 16) and Dedijer (1981, p. 35) associate Škorpik with the rank of poručnik korvete; the exception being Freivogel (2020, p. 131) who refers to him as being a poručnik fregate (Frigate Lieutenant) during April 1941.)
- Conflicts: World War II in Yugoslavia †
- Awards: Order of the People's Hero (posthumous)

Velimir Škorpik (2 April 1919 – 7 November 1943) was a Croatian and Yugoslav Partisan naval officer and commander of several early Partisan naval units. After graduating from the Naval Academy in 1940, Škorpik began his naval career as an officer in the Royal Yugoslav Navy (Serbo-Croatian: Kraljevska mornarica – KM). Following the Axis invasion of Yugoslavia in April 1941 which saw the rapid collapse of the KM, Škorpik joined the Armed Forces of the Independent State of Croatia, serving as a harbour officer in Makarska. After coming into contact with local communist operatives, he eventually defected to the Partisans in late 1942.

Škorpik soon met with Josip Broz Tito and would be given the command of the Naval Section (Sekcija za ratnu mornaricu), an early Partisans naval formation tasked with organizing attacks on Axis forces in the coastal areas. He would go on to command Partisan detachments operating in the Dalmatian Hinterland followed by a brief stint as the commander of a fleet of Partisan armed ships in September/October 1943. His last posting was that of the Chief of Staff of the 3rd Dalmatian Brigade. He was killed by the Ustaše in October/November 1943 near Posušje.

He was posthumously awarded the title of People's Hero of Yugoslavia. The Naval Repair Yard in Šibenik also bore his name from 1953 until 1992 as well as a Yugoslav Navy Osa-class missile boat acquired from the USSR during the 1960s.

== Biography ==
=== Early military service ===
Škorpik was born on 2 April 1919 in Brodarica near Zadar. After completing his high school education, he enrolled in the Naval Academy from which he graduated in 1940, serving in the Royal Navy (Serbo-Croatian: Kraljevska mornarica – KM) with the rank of poručnik korvete (Corvette Lieutenant). When the Axis invasion of Yugoslavia commenced on 6 April 1941, Škorpik was the second-in-command of the motor torpedo boat Četnik based in Šibenik. With Yugoslavia soon surrendering to the Axis, Škorpik took Četnik to Divulje near Split in order to avoid capture by the Italians and possibly to join the nascent Navy of the Independent State of Croatia (Croatian: Ratna Mornarica Nezavisne Države Hrvatske – RMNDH). Arriving in Divulje, he attempted to damage the boat before departing for Split and eventually to Zagreb where joined the armed forces of the newly-established Axis puppet state Independent State of Croatia (Croatian: Nezavisna Država Hrvatska – NDH). His first and only posting with the NDH forces was that of a harbour officer in Makarska, where he soon came in touch with local members of the communist party, eventually becoming its member in late 1941. After months of secretly spreading propaganda material and passing information on Italian and NDH plans to the communists, Škorpik was ordered by the Party to abandon his post and make way to the Biokovo mountain. On 1 December 1942, Škorpik, his father, NCOs Stjepan Muhtić and Ratko Franković with the help of several partisans of the Biokovo Battalion "Vid Mihaljević", escaped Makarska taking with them dozens of rifles and ammunition. Škorpik left a proclamation calling on other naval personnel to follow their example, asserting the "truncated Croatian Navy existed only on paper" and how "... our fleet has been treacherously handed over to the enemy... using their guns to attack our villages and cities".

=== Yugoslav Partisans ===
Ten days later, Škorpik made his way from Biokovo to the Fourth Operational Zone Headquarters (Serbo-Croatian: Štab četvrte operativne zone) in Glamoč, from where he continued to Bosanski Petrovac arriving on 18 December. There, he was invited to the Supreme Headquarters to brief the Party leadership on the actions carried out by Partisan forces on the sea and discuss future possibilities. Writing on the occasion of the tenth anniversary of the Yugoslav Navy in 1952, Josip Broz Tito recounted meeting Škorpik:

A group of comrades from Dalmatia arrived in Glamoč as well. With that group came, then a colonel and now a general, Škorpik with his son, a young naval officer who later died. Very young and full of all sorts of plans on how to successfully harass the occupiers on the sea, the young Škorpik didn't seem very convincing to me, but when I discussed several specific, technical and other possibilities, especially regarding the men, the fighters, I realized the time has come and that this will be another area where the partisan struggle will be successful...

— Tito, in "Jugoslavenski Jadran", 1952.

On same day of 18 December, The Supreme Headquarters issued the order for the creation of the Naval Section (Serbo-Croatian: Sekcija za ratnu mornaricu) adjunct to the Fourth Operational Zone Headquartersd with Škorpik in command. Škorpik assumed command in Livno on 23 December with the task of gathering personnel and forming the First Naval Detachment (Serbo-Croatian: Prvi mornarički odred), while Muhtić and Franković were instructed to return to the coast and establish naval stations. The Naval Detachment was formed in Podgora on 23 January 1943 composed of around 150 partisans and a flotilla consisting of two armed boats. The Naval Section was disbanded in February when the Fourth Operational Zone Headquarters became the 9th Division Headquarters, while Škorpik assumed the command of the Naval Detachment. After several successful defensive actions along the Makarska Riviera, the Detachment was reorganized in March 1943 as the Biokovo Partisan Detachment with Škorpik continuing his command. In mid-May, he assumed the role of the Chief of Staff of the Cetina Detachment, followed by the role of commander of the Group of Cetina Battalions in August.

Following the Italian surrender in September 1943, the Partisans took control of the Dalmatian coast and islands previously occupied by Italian forces, prompting German forces to recapture Split, Šibenik and Zadar fearing a potential Allied amphibious landing. On 19 September 1943 the Coastal Command (Serbo-Croatian: Obalska komanda – OK) was formed in Split with Škorpik as its commanding officer. The OK consisted of an armed ships flotilla, the 1st Island Brigade, coastal artillery and a single floatplane. It began operating in a situation where Partisan and German forces were engaged in heavy fighting for Split, while the unit itself lacked any serious supplies or equipment to fulfill the tasks set before it. The order to retreat from Split was given on 23 September and on 25 September, the OK relocated to Bol on Brač. With Split occupied by German Forces, the OK found itself without a line of communication with their superiors - the Fourth Operational Zone Headquarters (Note: The Fourth Operational Zone Headquarters was reestablished in August 1943.) - which was relocating to the Livno Field. Following a meeting held on 29 September between the OK staff and members of the Provincial Committee of the Communist Party, the OK was dissolved and reformed as the Armed Ships Fleet Headquarters (Serbo-Croatian: Štab flote naoružanih brodova) under Škorpik, while the 1st Island Brigade and coastal artillery batteries became standalone units. Faced with an increasingly difficult situation due to a lack of medical supplies, food and materiel for their ships, it was decided that a delegation consisting of former OK members, political commissar Sergije Makiedo and technical officer Adam Armanda, will take the steamboat Bakar to Italy and make contact with Allied Forces. Despite being instructed before the retreat from Split not travel to Italy without the approval of the Supreme Headquarters, Škorpik nonetheless authorized the mission.

Once the news of the first Partisan mission to Italy reached the Supreme Headquarters, the Fourth Operational Zone Headquarters summoned Škorpik to report on the event, which he did, despite reports from others involved explaining their actions not arriving yet. Until the situation was resolved, Škorpik was assigned the position of the Chief of Staff of the 3rd Dalmatian Brigade which would be his final posting. On 18 October 1943 the Navy of the People's Liberation Army (Serbo-Croatian: Mornarica narodnooslobodilačke vojske Jugoslavije – MNOVJ) was formed by the order of the Supreme Headquarters. Škorpik was initially expected to assume the role of the Chief of Staff but ultimately never did. (Note: The initial order of the Supreme Headquarters issued on 18 October specified the following Staff structure of the MNOVJ: Srećko Manola (commander), Velimir Škorpik (Chief of Staff) and Sergije Makiedo (political commissar). The revised order dated to 24 October specified: Josip Černi (commander), Srećko Manola (executive officer) and Uroš Mardešić (Chief of Staff).) There are some inconsistensies regarding the date of Škorpik's death: according to Huljić (1979), Škorpik was killed by the Ustaše in early October, a fact unknown to the Supreme Headquarters when they issued their original order for the formation of the MNOVJ. According to others, he was killed by the Ustaše on 7 November near the village of Zagorje.

== Legacy ==
The Partisan mission to Italy authorized by Škorpik was a success; the Yugoslav delegation reached Bari, made contact with Allied Forces and over the course of several days made their way to Algiers where the Allied Force Headquarters was located. The Allies assigned two liaisons officers for future contant while on 15 October Bakar departed Italy bound for Vis, fully loaded with supplies. On 8 September 1952 he posthumously received the title of People's Hero of Yugoslavia. From 1953, the Naval Repair Yard in Šibenik was named in his honour until 1992 and the breakup of Yugoslavia. The Yugoslav Navy Osa I-class missile boat Velimir Škorpik (RČ-310), acquired from the Soviet Union during the 1960s, was named in Škorpik's honour. The boat was captured by Croatian forces and commissioned in the Croatian Navy as Dubrovnik. A street in Zagreb was named after him in 1993.
