= VAS (motorboat) =

Class overview
- Operators: Regia Marina; Italian Navy
- Built: 1942
- In service: 1942–1956

General characteristics (as built)
- Type: Motor torpedo boat/Submarine chaser
- Displacement: Type 1&2: 68.8 t (67.7 long tons; 75.8 short tons); Type 3: 90 t (89 long tons; 99 short tons)
- Length: Type 1&2: 28 m (92 ft); Type 3: 34.1 m (112 ft)
- Beam: Type 1&2: 4.3 m (14 ft); Type 3: 5 m (16 ft)
- Draft: Type 1&2: 1.35 m (4 ft 5 in); Type 3: 2.1 m (6 ft 11 in)
- Propulsion: Type 1: 3 shafts; 2 Fiat + 1 Carraro petrol engines; 1,500 hp (1,100 kW)/300 hp (220 kW)
- Speed: 20 knots (37 km/h)
- Range: up to 1,100 nautical miles (2,000 km) at 12 knots (22 km/h)
- Crew: 26
- Armament: 2 × 450mm torpedo tubes or a 37mm AA gun (type 3); 26-30 depth charges; 1 or 2 × 20mm Breda AA; 2 × 6.5mm machine guns

Vedetta anti sommergibile (anti-submarine picket boat), commonly abbreviated as VAS and also known in Italy as VAS Baglietto (from the name of the shipyard that designed VAS and built a number of them), was a class of motor torpedo boats that served as coastal anti-submarine patrol boats in the Regia Marina (Italian Royal Navy) during World War II. Several boats that survived the war later served in the post-war Italian Navy. The boats were officially classified as "anti-submarine patrol boats" and the first 30 boats were ordered by the Regia Marina at the Baglietto shipyards on 3 September 1941, entering service between March and November 1942.

The concept had first appeared in World War I and by the 1940s similar boats served with the US Navy where they were known as the PT boats, and they also had their European analogues in the German S-boots and the Royal Navy's Vosper and Fairmile MTBs. The VAS were in fact a roundabout development of the original S-boot, derived from the German-built Orjen-class torpedo boats of the Royal Yugoslav Navy captured by the Italians after the Axis invasion of Yugoslavia.

For all that the VAS were derived from MTBs, they were ultimately far closer in performance and intended role to the British Fairmile B motor launch, being both far slower and more defensive in nature than true MTBs.
