= Orjen-class torpedo boat =

Yugoslav Royal Navy class of motor torpedo boats

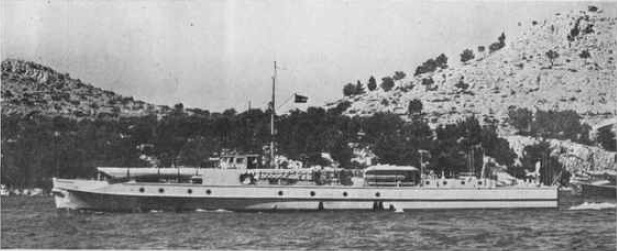
- Velebit photographed in 1939

Class overview
- Builders: Lürssen, Vegesack, Germany
- Operators: Royal Yugoslav Navy; Regia Marina; National Republican Navy; Kriegsmarine; Yugoslav Navy
- Built: 1936–1937
- In commission: 1936–1963
- Completed: 8
- Lost: 6
- Retired: 2

General characteristics (as completed)
- Type: Motor torpedo boat
- Displacement: 61.7 tonnes (60.7 long tons) (full)
- Length: 28 m (91 ft 10 in) (o/a)
- Beam: 4.3 m (14 ft 1 in)
- Draught: 1.55 m (5 ft 1 in)
- Installed power: 2,850–3,000 bhp (2,130–2,240 kW)
- Propulsion: 3 × shafts; 3 × Daimler-Benz BF2 12-cylinder four-stroke petrol engines with compressors; 1 × Maybach six-cylinder S5 auxiliary cruising engine
- Speed: 34 knots (63 km/h; 39 mph)
- Complement: 19
- Armament: 2 × 550 mm (21.7 in) torpedo tubes; 1 × Bofors 40 mm (1.6 in) gun; 1 × Zbrojovka Brno (ZB) Model 60 15 mm (0.59 in) machine gun

The Orjen class were motor torpedo boats (MTBs) built for the Royal Navy of Yugoslavia in 1936 and 1937. A total of eight boats were built by the Lürssen Shipyard at Vegesack, Germany. They were based on the German S-2 MTBs, and their primary armament was 533 mm (21 in) torpedoes launched from two 550 mm (21.7 in) torpedo tubes, with anti-aircraft protection provided by a 40 mm (1.6 in) gun and a 15 mm (0.59 in) machine gun. At the start of the April 1941 Axis invasion of Yugoslavia, two boats managed to escape to Alexandria in Egypt where they served under the operational command of the British Mediterranean Fleet and under the administrative control of the Yugoslav government-in-exile. Their duties included convoy escort duties and operations against Vichy French forces in Syria. The remaining six boats were captured by Italian forces and commissioned in the Regia Marina (Royal Italian Navy) with modified anti-aircraft armament, and were heavily employed in the Aegean Sea. They were also used by the Italians as the model for the Italian-built CRDA 60 t motor torpedo boats and the submarine chasers of the VAS class.

At the time of the Italian armistice in September 1943, one boat was scuttled by its crew. Another was damaged by its crew, but captured and repaired by the Germans and transferred to the National Republican Navy of the Italian Social Republic for use as a harbour defence vessel at Venice. This boat was later reclaimed by the Germans, and was mined then sank in a storm off the Italian coast in September 1944. The four other boats were taken over by German forces and commissioned in the Kriegsmarine (German Navy), but most suffered from engine problems. They served as part of the 24th S-Boat Flotilla, largely in the Aegean Sea, until they were finally stricken at Salonika in September 1944 as the Germans withdrew from Greece. The two boats that had escaped to the Allies in 1941 returned to Yugoslavia after the war. They were commissioned in the new Yugoslav Navy and remained in service until the early 1960s.

== Background ==
Following its creation in 1921, the Royal Navy (Serbo-Croatian: Kraljevska mornarica; KM; Краљевска Морнарица) of the Kingdom of Serbs, Croats and Slovenes (from 1929, the Royal Navy of Yugoslavia) was determined not to repeat the mistake of its predecessor, the Austro-Hungarian Navy, with its late adoption of motor torpedo boats (MTBs). Thus, in 1926, the KM had ordered two MTBs based on John I. Thornycroft & Company's existing class of 55-foot-long (17 m) Coastal Motor Boats from the United Kingdom. These boats entered KM service as the Uskok class in 1927. Plans to order more were derailed by a combination of negative assessments during their sea trials and crew training, combined with the advent of the Great Depression in 1929. During the early 1930s, Yugoslavia faced an economic recession which was further complicated by internal political instability. In the mid-1930s, the Yugoslav government sought to improve relations with Italy and Germany to create new economic opportunities for the country. Such cooperation resulted in the acquisition of new German-constructed ships for the KM, which had previously obtained ships from France and Great Britain. In 1936 the KM ordered eight MTBs (Serbo-Croatian Latin: motorna torpiljarka) that were to be built by the Lürssen shipyard in Vegesack, Germany, based on the existing German design of the S–2 class.

== Description and construction ==
The Orjen-class boats were an improved version of the S–2 class, designed with round-bilged displacement hulls which combined a high degree of seaworthiness with strength and light weight thanks to their composite construction using wood and steel. The double hull was constructed of mahogany arranged diagonally over steel frames, unlike the light alloy used in the original S-2 boats. The engines were also mounted on steel bearers. They had a flush deck without a raised forecastle, an enclosed steering room below an open command bridge. A searchlight and small antenna mast were also attached the roof of the steering room. The antenna stretched from this mast to the aft antenna mast near the aft gun mount. A lookout platform with a tall signal mast was located aft of the bridge. Above the engine rooms was a low superstructure with engine skylights, and aft of this was a low deckhouse above the crew accommodation, which also supported the aft gun mount.

The boats were larger and heavier than the original S-2 class, measuring 27.7 metres (90 ft 11 in) at the waterline and 28 m (91 ft 10 in) in length overall, with a 4.3 m (14 ft 1 in) beam and a draught of 1.55 m (5 ft 1 in). Their design displacement was 48.7 tonnes (47.9 long tons) and fully loaded they displaced 61.7 t (60.7 long tons). The boats were powered by three Daimler-Benz BF2 12-cylinder four-stroke petrol engines with compressors. Each engine was coupled to a shaft with a single propeller, the forward-mounted engine drove the central shaft and the outer engines drove the port and starboard shafts. The main rudder was semi-balanced, and there were also two small additional rudders to achieve the Lürssen effect – a reduction in wave-making resistance that forces the water under the hull outward, lifting the stern and reducing drag. Together, the three engines were rated at between 2,850–3,000 brake horsepower (2,130–2,240 kW), giving the boats a maximum speed of 34 knots (63 km/h; 39 mph). At full load displacement generating 2,805 bhp (2,092 kW) without using the compressors, the boats could achieve a top speed of only 31 kn (57 km/h; 36 mph), but with the compressors and the Lürssen effect, the maximum speed could be achieved. A six-cylinder Maybach S5 auxiliary cruising engine rated at 100 bhp (75 kW) was coupled to the central shaft with a chain, and powered the boats to a maximum speed of 7 kn (13 km/h; 8.1 mph). The boats carried 5.8 t (5.7 long tons) of gasoline, which gave them a range of 265 nautical miles (491 km; 305 mi) at 33 kn (61 km/h; 38 mph), 350 nmi (650 km; 400 mi) at 30 kn (56 km/h; 35 mph) and 950 nmi (1,760 km; 1,090 mi) at 7 kn. The Orjen-class boats had a crew of four officers, eleven petty officers and four sailors, but there was not sufficient accommodation on the boats for the whole crew. The officers and higher-rated petty officers had their accommodation aft of the engine rooms and on either side of the aft magazine, and the lower-rated petty officers and sailors had their accommodation located forward on either side of the forward magazine.

The primary armament of the boats consisted of two 550 mm (21.7 in) torpedo tubes, which were mounted forward in the open, unlike later German S-boats that had their torpedo tubes enclosed. The boats could carry four torpedoes, with one loaded in each tube and a reload secured aft of each tube. The boats carried the French 533 mm (21 in) torpedo, which was launched by a combination of compressed air and an explosive charge. For anti-aircraft defence a single Bofors 40 mm (1.6 in) gun was mounted on the aft deckhouse, for which 200 rounds were carried aboard. This gun supplemented by a single Zbrojovka Brno (ZB) Model 60 15 mm (0.59 in) machine gun mounted forward between the torpedo tubes. Two depth charge racks were also installed.

The boats were built in 1936 and 1937, with the eighth boat delivered in late 1937. Included in the contract were three replacement engines, two spare auxiliary engines and spare parts. In the late 1930s the Francophile faction of the KM proposed that all KM warships be re-equipped with French 21 in torpedoes, and the torpedo officer responsible for the Orjen class was sent to Saint-Tropez in France in 1937–1938 to supervise production of forty torpedoes for the KM. Delays meant that by 31 July 1938 only five had been delivered, meaning that most of the Orjen-class boats were not fully armed more than a year after they had been delivered. Diplomatic pressure resulted in faster production, but the last torpedoes were only delivered immediately prior to the outbreak of World War II on 1 September 1939. In 1938, four more boats were ordered, probably to be powered by MB 500 diesel engines rather than the petrol engines fitted to the first eight boats, for a sum of 3.7 million Reichsmarks, but the contract was cancelled due to the outbreak of war.

== Boats ==
The boats were named after Yugoslav mountains, and had their tactical numbers stencilled on their bows.

Name	Tactical No.	Namesake	Builder	Laid down	Launched	Completed	First Italian designation (1941)	Second Italian designation (1942)	German designation (September 1943)	First Yugoslav designation	Second Yugoslav designation
Orjen	1	Orjen	Lürssen, Vegesack, Nazi Germany	1936	1936	1936	MAS 3 D	MS 41	MS 41/S 605	—	—
Velebit	2	Velebit	Lürssen, Vegesack, Nazi Germany	1936	1936	1936	MAS 4 D	MS 42	S 601	—	—
Dinara	3	Dinara	Lürssen, Vegesack, Nazi Germany	1936	1936	1936	MAS 5 D	MS 43	S 602	—	—
Triglav	4	Triglav	Lürssen, Vegesack, Nazi Germany	1936	1937	1937	MAS 6 D	MS 44	S 603	—	—
Suvobor	5	Suvobor	Lürssen, Vegesack, Nazi Germany	1936	1937	1937	MAS 7 D	MS 45	—	—	—
Rudnik	6	Rudnik	Lürssen, Vegesack, Nazi Germany	1936	1937	1937	MAS 8 D	MS 46	S 604	—	—
Kajmakčalan	7	Kajmakčalan	Lürssen, Vegesack, Nazi Germany	1936	1937	1937	—	—	—	TČ 6	TČ 392
Durmitor	8	Durmitor	Lürssen, Vegesack, Nazi Germany	1936	1937	1937	—	—	—	TČ 5	TČ 391

Sources: Fraccaroli (1974, pp. 176–177), Chesneau (1980, p. 359), Paterson (2015, p. 216), Freivogel (2020, p. 142) (Note: Fraccaroli and Chesneau provide their German designations as S 2–S 5, but Paterson and Freivogel are the more recent and detailed sources on their service in the KM and Kriegsmarine, so where details differ they have been used in preference to Fraccaroli and Chesneau.)

== Service history ==
=== Royal Yugoslav Navy service ===
Prior to the outbreak of war, and during the war until the April 1941 Axis invasion of Yugoslavia, all eight Orjen-class boats served with the 2nd Torpedo Division. When the invasion began on 6 April, Velebit – as division leader with the divisional commanding officer Kapetan corvette (Note: The rank of Kapetan corvette was roughly equivalent to a contemporary junior British Royal Navy commander.) Niko Kosović aboard, Kajmakčalan, Durmitor, Dinara, Triglav and Suvobor were deployed at Šibenik on the central Dalmatian coast, along with the two Uskok-class MTBs – also allocated to the 2nd Torpedo Division, and four 250t-class torpedo boats of the 3rd Torpedo Division. At the time, Orjen was being refitted at the Naval Arsenal at Tivat in the Bay of Kotor, and Rudnik had also been sent to the Bay of Kotor, possibly as an escort for the tanker Perun.

On 8 April, the combined 2nd and 3rd Torpedo Divisions were tasked to support an attack on the Italian enclave of Zara (Zadar) on the Dalmatia coast, which the Yugoslav High Command feared would be used as a bridgehead during the invasion. They were subjected to three Italian air attacks and, after the last one, sailed from the area of Zaton into Lake Prokljan, where they remained until 11 April. On 10 April, the establishment of an Axis puppet state carved out of Yugoslavia – the Independent State of Croatia – was announced, and the attack on Zara was cancelled. The divisional commander of the 3rd Torpedo Division, Kapetan bojnog broda (Note: The rank of Kapetan bojnog broda was equivalent to a contemporary British Royal Navy captain.) Ivan Kern, found that the crews of his division were refusing to follow orders, so he left his command and led the boats of the 2nd Torpedo Division to the Bay of Kotor, where they arrived on 13 April. The following day the crews became aware that a general Yugoslav surrender was imminent, and they were ordered not to provoke the invading forces. On 16 April, the Yugoslav submarine Nebojša evaded the Italians and escaped from the Bay of Kotor. Some officers and crew of the 2nd Torpedo Division also wished to evade capture by the Axis and continue their fight alongside Allied forces., but the crews of Suvobor, Velebit and Rudnik were opposed. By 17 April, the complete collapse of Yugoslav defences and the general surrender were imminent, prompting Kern to lead Durmitor, Kajmakčalan, Triglav and Dinara out of the Bay of Kotor that day. A fire in Triglav's engine room – sabotaged by one of her officers – caused her to turn back, and Dinara sailed to her assistance. Upon docking, both crews deserted. These two boats were later seized by the Italians, along with Suvobor, Velebit, Rudnik and Orjen.

Elsewhere in the Bay of Kotor, Milan Spasić and Sergej Mašera died blowing up the destroyer Zagreb to prevent her from falling into enemy hands. Kern sailed on with the two remaining boats, Durmitor and Kajmakčalan, loaded with personnel who wanted to continue the fight, including crew members from Velebit, Triglav and Orjen, the harbour defence ship Dalmacija and the tug Jaki. Because both boats were in poor condition and overloaded with personnel, the maximum speed they could achieve was 29 knots. The naval historian Zvonimir Freivogel describes as a "tall tale" a common story that the boats' crews deceived Italian destroyers while passing through Strait of Otranto by obtaining the password from one ship and using it to pass the other. Freivogel asserts that there were no Italian destroyers patrolling the strait that night. They managed to avoid detection by the Italian observation post on the island of Saseno near the Albanian port of Valona. Durmitor developed engine trouble and the boats split up. On 18 April Durmitor reached the island of Paxos off the western coast of Greece, and sailed on from there via the western Greek port of Preveza and Navarino Bay in southern Greece on 19 April, arriving at Souda Bay on the north-west coast of the island of Crete on 20 April. All three primary engines on Kajmakčalan broke down, and she sailed on her auxiliary engine, first to the village of Myrta on the island of Cephalonia off the west coast of Greece, then Argostoli, the main town on the island. There she encountered the Nebojša. The two vessels then sailed together to join Durmitor at Souda Bay. The three Yugoslav vessels accompanied several British and Greek ships to Alexandria in Egypt, arriving there on 27 April.

Once in Alexandria, they joined with other KM vessels and aircraft that had managed to escape, forming the KM-in-exile. The KM-in-exile was under the operational command of the British Mediterranean Fleet but was administered by the Yugoslav government-in-exile. The two boats were first tasked with patrolling the outside of the harbour in anticipation of an attack by Axis coastal craft, and also escorted small convoys in the area. In June they operated against Vichy French forces in Syria, and were sent to Haifa in Mandatory Palestine in July. By August they were operating off Mersa Matruh – some 240 km (130 nmi) west of Alexandria, but on 23 August Durmitor was again having engine trouble, and the pair returned to Alexandria. Between September 1941 and March 1942 the two boats underwent a refit at Port Said, where they were also fitted with ASDIC and their crews were trained for anti-submarine work. This was followed by more than a year of convoy escort duty between Alexandria, Mersa Matruh and Port Said, and on at least one occasion they engaged enemy aircraft. Over time the serviceability of the boats became a problem due to the lack of spare parts needed for their German-built engines, and their engine troubles continued. From September 1943 to March 1945 they were laid up at Alexandria. In March 1945, Durmitor and Kajmakčalan were transferred to Malta.

=== Axis service ===
The remaining six boats were captured by Italian forces and commissioned in the Regia Marina (Royal Italian Navy), receiving designations MAS 3–8 D, with "MAS" standing for Motoscafo Armato Silurante (Torpedo Armed Motorboat) and the prefix D denoting they were captured in Dalmatia. The captured boats and plans for them which were seized at Tivat in the Bay of Kotor were used as a model for the Italian-built CRDA 60 t motor torpedo boats, which were designated as Motosilurante ("MS", or Motor Torpedo Boat) to distinguish them from the smaller MAS boats already in Italian service. The Italians had sought in vain to convince the Germans to sell them the plans for their S-boat design. The existing Italian MAS boats had significant shortcomings, having a two-stepped hard-chine hydroplane design that lacked seaworthiness and was prone to damage, and the CRDA/MS boats were a significant improvement. The captured Orjen-class boats also served as a template for the Italian submarine chasers of the VAS class.

MAS 3–5 D formed the 24th MAS Squadron and were deployed in the Aegean Sea, where the principal Italian naval presence centred around three destroyers. The Italian Navy mission in the Aegean was sea control, which met with initial success but deteriorated over time. They and the Germans completely occupied the Aegean islands, and while Allied submarines conducted patrols through the area, inter-island traffic consisted mainly of low-value small schooners and caiques. The designations of the former Yugoslav boats were changed again in July 1942 to conform with the new "MS" prefix, and new numerals from 41 to 46.

During their Italian service, most of the boats were re-armed. On MS 41–44, the original Bofors gun and 15 mm machine gun were removed in favor of two single-mount 20 mm (0.79 in) Breda Model 35 L/65 (Note: L/65 denotes the length of the gun's barrel. In this case, the barrel of an L/65 gun is 65 calibre, meaning that the barrel is 65 times as long as the diameter of its bore.) guns, one each fore and aft. On these boats, the high masts were removed and replaced with shorter masts. On MS 45–46, the original armament and masts were retained. The boats were also re-equipped with Italian mine racks and could carry 12 to 20 depth charges. In Italian service the crew numbers remained the same, and they were painted in a camouflage scheme. The Germans tried to convince the Italians to hand over the Orjen-class boats to them, but the Italians refused. In turn, the Italians tried to convince the Germans to supply them with the new diesel engines they were installing in their newer S-boats, but the Germans needed all their output for their own boats. The Italians therefore installed high-quality Isotta Fraschini petrol engines – producing 3,300 bhp (2,500 kW) – in their new CRDA boats, and the engines of MAS 4 D/MS 42 (ex-Velebit) were also replaced with these engines. In Italian service, the boats operated mainly in the Aegean, and clocked up 568 missions and 6,300 operating hours.

When the Italian armistice was announced on 8 September 1943, MS 41 was damaged by them at the CRDA shipyard at Monfalcone where she was undergoing repairs, and was captured there by the Germans on 11 September. On 18 September, MS 45 was scuttled by her crew off Cattolica. MS 42 was captured by the Germans at Piraeus, and the remaining three boats were captured at Souda Bay. The four boats that were captured intact, MS 42–44 and MS 46, were designated by the Kriegsmarine (German Navy) as S 601–604 respectively. They formed part of the 24th S-Boat Flotilla, which was to consist of nine captured MTBs, including the five remaining Orjen-class boats. At the time of their capture they were split between the Adriatic and the Aegean, and only eight became operational. While operated by the Germans, all of the boats retained the armament they had carried under the Italians, and the crew numbers remained the same.

In December 1943, MS 41 was transferred to the National Republican Navy of the Italian Social Republic, the fascist rump puppet state in northern Italy that was established by the Germans after the armistice. S 601 and S 603 had engine problems at the time of their capture, and after repairs were commissioned on 6 December 1943 and 24 January 1944. On 25 January, the two boats departed the island of Salamis near Piraeus for the Adriatic. They passed through the Corinth Canal and reached Patras, west of Athens, to refuel. At this point, S 603 developed engine problems and S 601 towed her towards the island of Corfu in the Ionian Sea. As they neared the island, the two boats were attacked by four Supermarine Spitfire fighter-bombers of the Royal Air Force. One of the attackers was shot down by S 601, but both boats were damaged, two of her crew were killed, and several more were wounded or both boats. They put into Corfu for repairs.

On 22 February 1944, S 601 and S 603 attempted to continue their voyage to the Adriatic, but two carburetter fires on S 603 forced a return to port. On 4 March 1944 MS 41 was reclaimed by the Germans and employed under the designation MS 41 or S 605 as a harbour defence vessel in Venice. During a test run on 14 March, the cruising engine on S 603 exploded, injuring two crewmen. A decision was made to return S 603 to Piraeus, and S 601 again took her under tow. The two boats reached Patras on 29 March, and S 601 was tasked to support operations against Greek partisans following a British Special Boat Service raid on Stampalia. She intercepted a 60-tonne (59-long-ton; 66-short-ton) sailing vessel carrying fuel near Oxeia and destroyed it with an explosive charge. The following day she transported 20 German soldiers and towed the artillery lighter MAL12 to Oxeia to assist with mopping-up operations, but by the time they arrived, the enemy was gone. The two boats then proceeded to Salamis. In April, S 601 towed S 603 to Salonika, receiving cover from S 602 – which had also been commissioned on 24 January 1944 – and assistance from the steamer Zar Ferdinand to tow on S 603 on the last leg of the trip. No further repairs were undertaken to bring the S 603 back into operational service. All three boats were stricken on 18 September as the Germans withdrew from Greece due to Red Army advances in the Balkans. S 601 was sunk by Allied aerial torpedoes after she was stricken, and S 602 and S 603 were scuttled by the Germans as they withdrew. S 604 had been commissioned on 14 November 1943, but like her sister boats she suffered from engine problems and was rarely operational. She was transferred to Salonika after her sisters, and was also stricken on 18 September and scuttled. On 27 September 1944 MS 41/S 605 struck a mine near Porto Corsini – the harbour of Ravenna – and sank the following day during a gale off the mouth of the Montone River, with seven of her crew lost.

=== Post-war service ===
After the end of the war, Durmitor and Kajmakčalan, along with other KM ships and personnel in exile, returned to Šibenik in May 1945. They were commissioned in the new Yugoslav Navy (Serbo-Croatian Latin: Jugoslavenska ratna mornarica, JRM) as TČ 5 and TČ 6, later being redesignated as TČ 391 and TČ 392. In JRM service, the two boats were used as a template for the design of a bigger MTB/Motor Gun Boat prototype which was eventually rebuilt as an auxiliary vessel, the JRM having ordered new MTBs of a Soviet design. Both boats were stricken and scrapped in 1963.

== See also ==
- List of ships of the Royal Yugoslav Navy
- List of ships of the Yugoslav Navy
