= Galeb-class minelayer =

Yugoslav navy ships

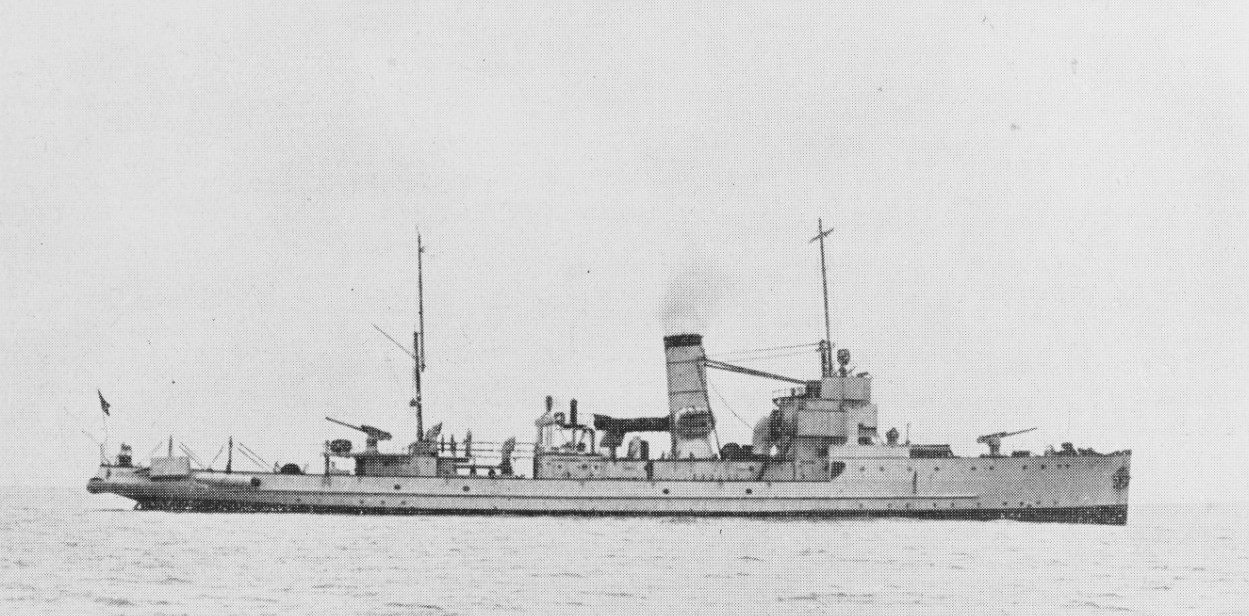
- Former German minesweeper M 120 in Italian service, sister ship to the Galeb-class ships

Class overview
- Operators: Royal Yugoslav Navy; Regia Marina; Yugoslav Navy
- Built: 1918–1919
- In commission: 1921–1955
- Completed: 6
- Lost: 5
- Scrapped: 1

General characteristics
- Type: Minelayer
- Displacement: 508 t (500 long tons) (standard); 548–560 t (539–551 long tons) (deep load)
- Length: 59.58–59.63 m (195 ft 6 in – 195 ft 8 in) (oa); 56.1 m (184 ft 1 in) (wl)
- Beam: 7.3 m (23 ft 11 in)
- Draught: 2.15 m (7 ft 1 in)
- Installed power: 2 × Marine boilers; 1,840–1,850 ihp (1,370–1,380 kW)
- Propulsion: 2 × Shafts; 2 × Triple expansion engines
- Speed: 15 knots (28 km/h; 17 mph)
- Endurance: 2,000 nmi (3,700 km; 2,300 mi) at 14 knots (26 km/h; 16 mph)
- Complement: 40
- Armament: 2 × single Škoda 90 mm (3.5 in) L/45 guns; 2 × Zbrojovka Brno 15 mm (0.59 in) ZB-60 anti-aircraft machine guns; 24 or 30 naval mines

The Galeb class, also known as the Orao class, were minelayers originally built as minesweepers for the Imperial German Navy between 1918 and 1919.

In July 1921, the six unarmed vessels were purchased as "tugs" for the navy of the newly created Kingdom of the Serbs, Croats and Slovenes (from 1929, the Kingdom of Yugoslavia). Re-armed with two Škoda 90 mm (3.5 in) guns and two anti-aircraft machine guns, they could also carry 24 or 30 naval mines. Initially classified as mining tenders or mine carriers, they were mainly used for training and "show the flag" cruises along the Adriatic coast and islands, introducing the navy to the populace. In 1931 their guns were re-lined or replaced with 83.5 mm (3.29 in) caliber barrels. In 1935 three ships of the class visited the Greek island of Corfu as part of a "show the flag" cruise, and the following year all ships of the class were re-designated as minelayers. In the lead-up to the April 1941 Axis invasion of Yugoslavia, several ships of the class laid minefields off the Yugoslav coast, which probably resulted in the sinking of two Yugoslav merchant ships. All six were captured by Italy during the invasion.

They were then put into service by the Regia Marina (Italian Royal Navy) under new names as submarine chasers, operating as escorts between Italy and North Africa and along the North African coast. Subjected to attacks by Allied submarines and aircraft, five of the ships were lost or sunk during the war. The remaining vessel escaped being captured by the Germans during the Italian surrender in September 1943, and it was returned to the Royal Yugoslav Navy-in-exile at Malta in December. It was transferred from the Navy-in-exile to the new Yugoslav Navy after the war and immediately employed to help clear the thousands of mines laid in Yugoslav waters during the war. Its armament was replaced, and it was renamed twice before being disposed of in 1962.

== Description and construction ==
The Galeb class was built as wartime M 1-class minesweepers by three German shipbuilding yards between 1917 and 1919. The M 1 class comprised 137 ships built between 1914 and 1919, divided into three sub-classes, M1914, M1915 and M1916, with progressive improvements in length, boiler arrangements and armament. The six ships of the Galeb class – also known as the Orao class – were all of the M1916 sub-class. The Regia Marina (Italian Royal Navy) also acquired two M 1 class M1916 sub-class ships in 1921. These sister ships were M 119 and M 120.

Construction
| Yugoslav name | German designation | Builder | Keel laid | Launched | Completed |
|---|---|---|---|---|---|
| Orao | M97 | Joh. C. Tecklenborg, Geestemünde | 1917 | 28 March 1918 | 21 April 1919 |
| Galeb | M100 | Tecklenborg, Geestemünde | 1917 | 23 May 1918 | 16 June 1919 |
| Gavran | M106 | Reiherstieg, Hamburg | 1917 | 8 July 1918 | 31 March 1919 |
| Jastreb | M112 | Tecklenborg, Geestemünde | 1917 | 12 November 1918 | 31 October 1919 |
| Kobac | M121 | Neptun, Rostock | 1917 | 10 September 1918 | 25 October 1919 |
| Sokol | M144 | Neptun, Rostock | 1917 | 10 March 1919 | 20 June 1919 |

=== Original construction ===
The hulls of the ships were of transverse steel frame construction with a box keel. They had a raised forecastle and a round tug stern, a single tall funnel and two masts. The fore-mast was encircled by the bridge, and the main-mast was located immediately forward of the aft gun mount. The ships had a waterline length of 56.1 m (184 ft 1 in), an overall length of 59.58–59.63 m (195 ft 6 in – 195 ft 8 in), a beam of 7.3 m (23 ft 11 in), and a normal draught of 2.15 m (7 ft 1 in). They had a designed displacement of 508 tonnes (500 long tons), and 548–560 tonnes (539–551 long tons) at deep load. The overall length and deep load displacement of the Yugoslav vessels varied slightly due to their construction by different shipyards. They used steam generated by two coal-fired marine boilers to drive two three-cylinder vertical triple expansion engines that powered two propeller shafts, each with a single 1.97 m (6 ft 6 in) diameter propeller. A single rudder was located between the propellers. The boilers were in separate boiler rooms, and the engines in a single engine room. The engines were rated at 1,840–1,850 indicated horsepower (1,370–1,380 kW) and were designed to propel the ship at a top speed of 16 knots (30 km/h; 18 mph). The ships carried 115 tonnes (113 long tons) of coal, which gave them a range of 2,000 nmi (3,700 km; 2,300 mi) at 14 knots (26 km/h; 16 mph). The crew consisted of 40 officers and men.

The ships of the class had good seakeeping characteristics, were responsive to controls, and had a good turning circle. With their minesweeping gear extended, the ships could maintain a maximum speed of 12.5–13 knots (23.2–24.1 km/h; 14.4–15.0 mph). They were equipped with two yawls as ship's boats. The ships of the class were armed with two 105 mm (4.1 in) SK L/45 naval guns (Note: L/45 denotes the length of the gun's barrel. In this case, the L45 gun is 45 calibre, meaning that the barrel was 45 times as long as the diameter of its bore.) and carried 120 rounds for each gun. They could carry 30 naval mines.

=== In Yugoslav service ===
In Royal Yugoslav Navy (Serbo-Croatian Latin: Kraljevska mornarica; Serbo-Croatian Cyrillic: Краљевска морнарица; КМ) service, the highest recorded speed of any of the ships was 15 knots (28 km/h; 17 mph). When the ships were acquired by the KM as "tugs" in 1921, their original armament had been removed. In KM service their official crew numbered 19, but as they were training ships this was supplemented with instructors and students, and shortly before the Axis invasion in April 1941 the complement was increased to 40. After delivery they were fitted with two Škoda 90 mm (3.5 in) L/45 guns. These were surplus Austro-Hungarian Navy guns that had been intended for mounting on ships that were incomplete at the end of World War I. The guns had been sent to Pula and the Bay of Kotor as coastal artillery, and they were seized by the Serbian Army as the war ended, and thus avoided being acquired by the occupying French forces. These guns weighed 1,180 kg (2,600 lb) each, and when combined with their mount they weighed 3,910 kg (8,620 lb). The shells weighed 10.2 kg (22 lb), and they could be fired at a rate of between three and eleven per minute to a maximum range of 12,300 m (40,400 ft). From the time they were re-armed until the Hrabri-class submarines joined the navy in 1928, the ships of the Galeb class had the most powerful guns in the Yugoslav fleet. The ships were also equipped with two Zbrojovka Brno 15 mm (0.59 in) ZB-60 anti-aircraft machineguns. Sources vary on the number of naval mines that could be carried by the ships while in Yugoslav service, with sources stating either 24 or 30.

In 1931, at least four ships of the class had their guns re-lined to 83.5 mm (3.29 in) to use the same ammunition as the dual-purpose guns fitted to the Yugoslav light cruiser Dalmacija. The remainder were fitted with new guns in the same calibre. The combined gun and mount weighed 4,500 kg (9,900 lb). The shells weighed 10 kg (22 lb), and the guns could be fired at a rate of twelve per minute, to a maximum range of 17,000 m (56,000 ft) and a vertical height of 12,000 m (39,000 ft).

In Yugoslav Navy service following World War II, the engines of the surviving ship were rated at 1,600 indicated horsepower (1,200 kW) and her top speed remained 15 kn. With a load of 130 t (130 long tons) of coal, she achieved a range of 1,350 nmi (2,500 km; 1,550 mi) at 15 kn and 1,516 nmi (2,808 km; 1,745 mi) at 8 kn (15 km/h; 9.2 mph). Her crew was increased to 68. The ship's armament was replaced by two Vickers QF 2-pounder naval guns, one twin German 20 mm (0.79 in) Flak 38 and two twin Browning 12.7 mm (0.50 in) machine guns. She could carry either 22 SAG-1 or 34 SAG-2 naval mines.

== Service history ==
=== Yugoslav service ===
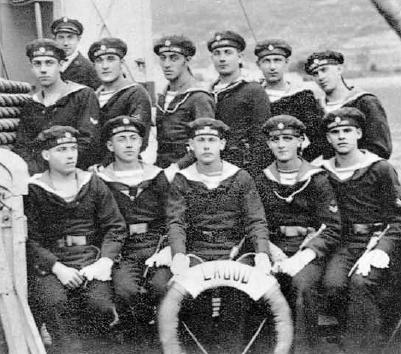
Some of the crew of Labud in February 1928

The six minesweepers were bought by the government of the Kingdom of Serbs, Croats and Slovenes (later Yugoslavia) on 20 July 1921 for 1,400,000 marks each. Taken into service in the navy of the new kingdom, they were initially classified as mining tenders, or mine carriers (Serbo-Croatian: minonosci). They were renamed Orao (Eagle), Galeb (Seagull), Gavran (Raven), Jastreb (Hawk), Kobac (Sparrow Hawk), and Sokol (Falcon). They were used as training ships for the fledgling navy, and the ships of the class were also used for "show the flag" cruises along the Adriatic coast and islands, introducing the navy to the populace. They also exercised with the eight 250t-class torpedo boats the navy had acquired from defeated Austria-Hungary after World War I, as a means of assessing training standards. In 1923, Gavran was renamed Labud (Swan). In 1932, the British naval attaché reported that the crews of Yugoslav ships were engaging in little gunnery training and few exercises or manoeuvres, due to reduced budgets. In August 1935, the seaplane carrier Zmaj accompanied by Galeb, Labud and Kobac, visited the Greek island of Corfu. By 1936, the class had been re-classified as minelayers. In 1938–39 Jastreb's boilers were refitted for oil-firing only.

After World War II broke out, the ships were brought to a heightened state of readiness, although Yugoslavia remained neutral. In the weeks prior to the April 1941 German-led Axis invasion of Yugoslavia, the ships of the class laid several protective minefields along the Adriatic coast. It is likely that mines laid near the island of Zlarin off the port of Šibenik by Labud and Kobac resulted in the loss of the 1,726-gross register ton (GRT) passenger steamer Prestolonaslednik Petar and the 1,204 GRT passenger steamer Karađorđe on 2 April, when they were directed to make port at Šibenik instead of the Bay of Kotor. On 6 April – the first day of the invasion – aircraft of the Yugoslav Maritime Air Force provided air cover while Jastreb laid a minefield off Budva harbour. During the invasion all the ships of the class were captured by the Italians. Kobac's crew defected with their ship to the newly created fascist puppet state called the Independent State of Croatia (Serbo-Croatian: Nezavisna Država Hrvatska, NDH) at Šibenik on 10 April, but she was soon after seized by the Italian navy. The crews of Galeb and Labud also sailed to Šibenik in an attempt to join the NDH navy, but they were intercepted and captured by the Italians on 17 and 21 April respectively. Also on 17 April, Sokol and Orao were captured at Split while undergoing repairs. During the chaos of the surrender, Orao was sabotaged by an explosive charge in a boiler. Jastreb was captured at the Bay of Kotor.

=== Italian service ===
The six ships of the class were soon put into commission in the Italian navy as follows:

Italian ship names
| Yugoslav name | Italian name | From the Italian name for the island of: | Date of commissioning |
|---|---|---|---|
| Orao | Vergada | Vrgada | 25 October 1941 |
| Galeb | Selve | Silba | 25 May 1941 |
| Labud | Zuri | Žirje | 29 May 1941 |
| Jastreb | Zirona | Drvenik | Unknown |
| Kobac | Unie | Unije | 30 November 1941 |
| Sokol | Eso | Iž | Unknown |

All six ships were re-commissioned as submarine chasers, and they were used as escorts on the supply routes between Italy and North Africa and along the North African coast. They were suited to this role due to their solid build and high endurance.

==== Vergada ====
Put into service by the Italians after repairs, Vergada's crew sailed her to Malta at the time of the Italian surrender in September 1943. She was handed back to the Royal Yugoslav Navy-in-exile in Malta on 7 December.

==== Selve ====
From 15 to 17 December 1941, Selve and Zuri escorted the steamer Cadamosto and the German steamer Spezia between the Italian Libya ports of Benghazi and Tripoli. On 26 June 1942 she left Trapani on the west coast of Sicily, accompanied by her sisters Eso and Oriole (ex-Zuri), escorting the steamer Iseo to Tripoli. Eso and Oriole collided, and due to damage caused in the collision they were towed back to Trapani by Selve, with Iseo sailing on alone and safely reaching Tripoli on 28 June. From 1 to 4 August, Selve, Eso, and the Rosolino Pilo-class torpedo boat Giuseppe Dezza escorted the steamer Istria from Tripoli to Benghazi, and on 7 and 8 August, Selve and her sister Oriole escorted the steamer Iseo from Benghazi to Tobruk – also in Italian Libya. Selve, along with the torpedo boat Sagittario, escorted the steamers Sibilla and Albachiara from Tobruk to Benghazi between 11 and 13 August. This was followed by an escort, accompanied by Eso, of the German steamer Ostia and the tanker Olympos from Benghazi to Tobruk on 23 and 24 August, during which the British U-class submarine HMS Unison made an unsuccessful attack.

On 31 August and 1 September, Selve escorted the steamer Alato from Tobruk to Derna in Italian Libya, and she was quickly joined by two German submarine chasers escorting Olympos to the same port. From 14 to 20 September, Selve escorted the steamer Sportivo from Benghazi to Tripoli, and on her return voyage between 29 September and 1 October she escorted the steamers Amba Alagi and Anna Maria. Selve was damaged by a Royal Air Force air raid at Benghazi on 6 November and burned out, being broken up in 1948.

==== Zuri then Oriole ====
In December 1941, Zuri was involved in two escorts from Benghazi to Tripoli. The first was alongside Selve accompanying Cadamosto and Spezia, and the second was from 22 to 24 December escorting the tankers Polifemo and Labor, the salvage vessel Raffio, and the tug Proteo. From 13 to 16 January 1942, Zuri escorted the German steamer Brook from Tripoli to Palermo in Sicily. Brook was attacked and slightly damaged by Allied aircraft on 14 January, but she made it to Palermo under her own power.

On 1 June, Zuri was renamed Oriole. After repairs following the collision with Eso, on 8 July Oriole replaced the La Masa-class torpedo boat Enrico Cosenz, which, along with the Turbine-class destroyer Turbine was escorting the tanker Pici Fassio from Trapani to Tripoli. From 20 to 26 July, Oriole escorted the steamers Pertusola and Tripolino from Tripoli to Tobruk; they were joined by the Spica-class torpedo boat Clio from Benghazi onwards. On 7 and 8 August, Oriole and Selve escorted Iseo from Benghazi to Tobruk. On 15 January 1943, Oriole departed Tripoli accompanying the steamer Zenobia Martini, but two days later her charge was torpedoed and sunk by the British U-class submarine HMS Unseen. On 24 January 1943, Oriole escorted the steamer Galiola from Sousse in the French protectorate of Tunisia to Messina in Sicily. After the Tunisian campaign ended with the Axis surrender in May, Oriole sailed to Italy. She was scuttled by her crew on 10 July 1943 at Augusta, Sicily, in the face of advancing British troops, following damage she sustained in an air attack south of Messina.

==== Zirona ====
Zirona had a short career in Italian service, as she was damaged and beached near Benghazi on 24–25 November 1941 after a British air raid, and she was partially blown up by the Italians on 28 November. When the Italians withdrew from Benghazi on 18 November 1942, they scuttled the wreck in an attempt to block the entrance to the harbour.

==== Unie ====
On 28 December 1942 Unie accompanied the steamer Sivigliano from Bizerte to Tunis in French Tunisia, but little else is known about her activity. She was destroyed by an explosion at Bizerte following an air raid by the United States Army Air Forces on 30 January 1943.

==== Eso ====
Following the June 1942 collision with Oriole, Eso returned to service on 30 July, escorting Istria from Trapani to Tripoli alongside Giuseppe Dezza where they were joined by Selve for the remainder of the voyage to Benghazi. On 12 August, Eso escorted the steamer Paolina on its first leg from Tripoli to Palermo, and handed over the escort to Sagittario, after which Paolina struck a mine and sank off Sfax in Tunisia. On 15 and 16 August, Eso escorted the tanker Ennio from Tripoli to Benghazi, and followed this by accompanying the German steamer Kreta from Benghazi to Tobruk between 29 and 31 August. During the latter voyage both ships were unsuccessfully attacked by Allied aircraft. Eso escorted the steamer Ascianghi from Benghazi to Tobruk between 15 and 19 September, and also escorted her between Tobruk and Tripoli between 27 September and 2 October.

From 12 to 14 October, Eso and Oriole escorted Tripolino from Benghazi to Tobruk, and between 21 and 24 October Eso accompanied the steamer Siculo from Benghazi to Tripoli. British aircraft unsuccessfully attacked the motor vessel Col Di Lana near Misurata in Libya while she was being escorted by Eso and the Spica-class torpedo boat Partenope between Benghazi and Tripoli on 10 and 11 October. On 16 and 17 November, Eso escorted the steamers Giuseppe Leva and Salona from Buerat in Libya to Tripoli. On 24 and 25 November, Eso was escorting the steamer Algerino between Tripoli and Buerat when the latter was damaged in an Allied air attack on 25 November. Eso attempted to tow the crippled steamer, but she sank the following day off Zliten in Libya. On 19 January 1943, Eso and the Palestro-class torpedo boat San Martino were escorting the steamer Edda from Tripoli to Trapani when the steamer was torpedoed by the British U-class submarine HMS Unbroken. Eso and San Martino unsuccessfully chased Unbroken, but during the night of 19/20 January Royal Navy aircraft torpedoed and sank both Edda and Eso 7 km (4.3 mi) east of Djerba Island off the Tunisian coast.

=== Post-war Yugoslav service ===
Vergada remained in service with the Royal Yugoslav Navy-in-exile for the rest of the war, and having been renamed Orao she was delivered to the post-war Yugoslav Navy at Split in August 1945. She was renamed Pionir soon after. Almost 3,000 mines had been laid in Yugoslav coastal waters during the war, and all available minesweepers – including Pionir – were engaged in clearing them. She was renamed Zelengora in 1955, and was stricken from the naval register in 1962 and scrapped shortly thereafter.
