= Commander of the Yugoslav Navy =

- Zapovjednik jugoslavenske mornarice

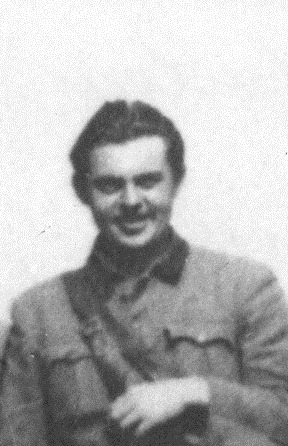
- Longest serving Admiral Mate Jerković; 1950 – 1967
- Royal Yugoslav Navy (until 1945); Yugoslav Navy (after 1945)
- Reports to: Chief of the General Staff
- Seat: Split, Croatia
- Term length: No fixed length
- Precursor: Commander-in-Chief of the Austro-Hungarian Navy
- Formation: 31 October 1918
- First holder: Dragutin Prica
- Final holder: Mile Kandić
- Abolished: 20 May 1992
- Succession: Commander of the Croatian Navy; Commander of Montenegrin Navy; Serbian Navy Commander; Chief of the Slovenian Navy

The Commander of the Yugoslav Navy was the highest-ranking officer and official head of the Royal Yugoslav Navy and its successor.

== List of commanders ==
=== Kingdom of Serbs, Croats and Slovenes (1918–1929) ===
No.	Portrait	Name	Took office	Left office	Time in office	Ref.
1	Dragutin Prica	Kontraadmiral; Dragutin Prica (1867–1960)	31 October 1918	30 November 1918	30 days	
2	Metod Koch [hr]	Kontraadmiral; Metod Koch (1874–1952)	1 December 1918	1 September 1920	1 year, 275 days	
3	Viktor Wikerhauser [sr]	Admiral; Viktor Wikerhauser (1866–1940)	2 September 1920	17 October 1923	3 years, 46 days	
(1)	Dragutin Prica	Admiral; Dragutin Prica (1867–1960)	22 October 1923	18 October 1929	5 years, 361 days	

=== Kingdom of Yugoslavia (1929–1945) ===
No.	Portrait	Name	Took office	Left office	Time in office	Ref.
1	Viktor Wikerhauser [sr]	Admiral; Viktor Wikerhauser (1866–1940)	18 October 1929	7 April 1932	2 years, 172 days	
2	Nikola Stanković	Viceadmiral; Nikola Stanković (1875–1942)	7 April 1932	6 March 1934	1 year, 333 days	
3	Marijan Polić [hr]	Viceadmiral; Marijan Polić (1876–1958)	7 March 1934	17 April 1940	6 years, 41 days	
4	Julijan Luterotti	Viceadmiral; Julijan Luterotti (1884–1956)	18 April 1940	3 April 1941	350 days	
5	Emil Domainko	Kontraadmiral; Emil Domainko (1889–1968)	3 April 1941	17 April 1941	14 days	

=== Socialist Federal Republic of Yugoslavia (1945–1992) ===
No.	Portrait	Name	Took office	Left office	Time in office	Ref.
1	Ivan Kern	Kontraadmiral; Ivan Kern (1898–1991)	1945	22 December 1945	0 years	
2	Josip Černi [sl]	Viceadmiral; Josip Černi (1903–2000)	1945	1950	4–5 years	
3	Mate Jerković [hr]	Admiral; Mate Jerković (1915–1980)	1950	1967	16–17 years	
4	Bogdan Pecotić [sr]	Admiral; Bogdan Pecotić (1912–1998)	1967	1968	0–1 years	
5	Ljubo Truta [sr]	Admiral; Ljubo Truta (1915–1991)	1968	1969	0–1 years	
6	Ivo Purišić	Admiral; Ivo Purišić (1920–1976)	1969	1976	6–7 years	
7	Branko Mamula	Admiral; Branko Mamula (1921–2021)	1976	1979	5–6 years	
8	Tihomir Vilović [hr]	Viceadmiral; Tihomir Vilović (1924–2008)	1979	1984	4–5 years	
9	Božidar Grubišić [hr]	Admiral; Božidar Grubišić (1932–2021)	1984	1991	6–7 years	
10	Mile Kandić	Admiral; Mile Kandić (1933–2017)	1991	20 May 1992	0–1 years	
