= Dragutin Prica =

Austro-Hungarian and Yugoslav admiral

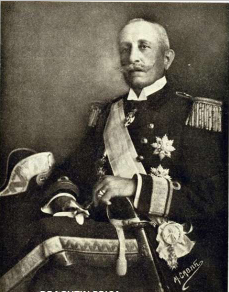
- Admiral Prica in 1925
- Native name: Драгутин Прица
- Born: 5 November 1867; Sveti Juraj, Kingdom of Croatia, Austria-Hungary
- Died: 14 June 1960 (aged 92) Opatija, PR Croatia, FPR Yugoslavia
- Allegiance: Austria-Hungary; Kingdom of Yugoslavia
- Branch: Austro-Hungarian Navy; Royal Yugoslav Navy
- Service years: 1885–1918; 1919–1929
- Rank: Admiral
- Conflicts: World War I

Dragutin Prica (Serbian Cyrillic: Драгутин Прица; 5 November 1867 – 14 June 1960) was a Croatian-born Austro-Hungarian and later Yugoslav admiral.

== Biography ==
Dragutin Prica was born on 5 November 1867 in Sveti Juraj, near Senj, Kingdom of Croatia, to Croatian Serb parents Maksim Prica and Ksenija Budisavljević.

He graduated from the Undersea Military Academy in Rijeka (1881-1885). After graduating from the academy, he served in the Austro-Hungarian Navy until 1918, when he retired at his own request. He made himself available to the National Council of Slovenes, Croats and Serbs. On 31 October 1918, he was appointed commissioner of the Minister of the Navy. After the formation of the Kingdom of Serbs, Croats and Slovenes, he was reactivated and accepted into the newly formed Royal Yugoslav Navy. From 25 July 1922 to 29 July 1923, he was the commander of the Bay of Kotor Command. He was appointed marshal of the court on 31 August 1923, but this decree was not acted upon and he remained available. He became the commander of the navy on 21 October 1923, and he remained in that position until his retirement. During that period, he became the adjutant of King Alexander I, and on 12 October 1927, he was appointed honorary adjutant of the king. He retired at his own request on 18 October 1929. He was the president of the Rotary Club Belgrade from 1931 to 1932.

He died on 14 June 1960 in Opatija. His cousin was Jovanka Broz.

== Promotions and awards ==
He was promoted to the rank of: Rear Admiral on 1 October 1918; vice admiral on 21 October 1923; and Admiral on 6 September 1925.

He was awarded the Order of the White Eagle, the Order of Saint Sava, the Order of Karađorđe's Star with Swords, the Iron Cross, the Order of the Iron Crown, the Order of Saint Anna and many others.

== Literature ==
Bjelajac, Mile S. (2004). Generali i admirali Kraljevine Jugoslavije 1918—1941. Belgrade: Institut za noviju istoriju Srbije. ISBN 978-86-7005-039-6.
