= Sveti Juraj =

- Village
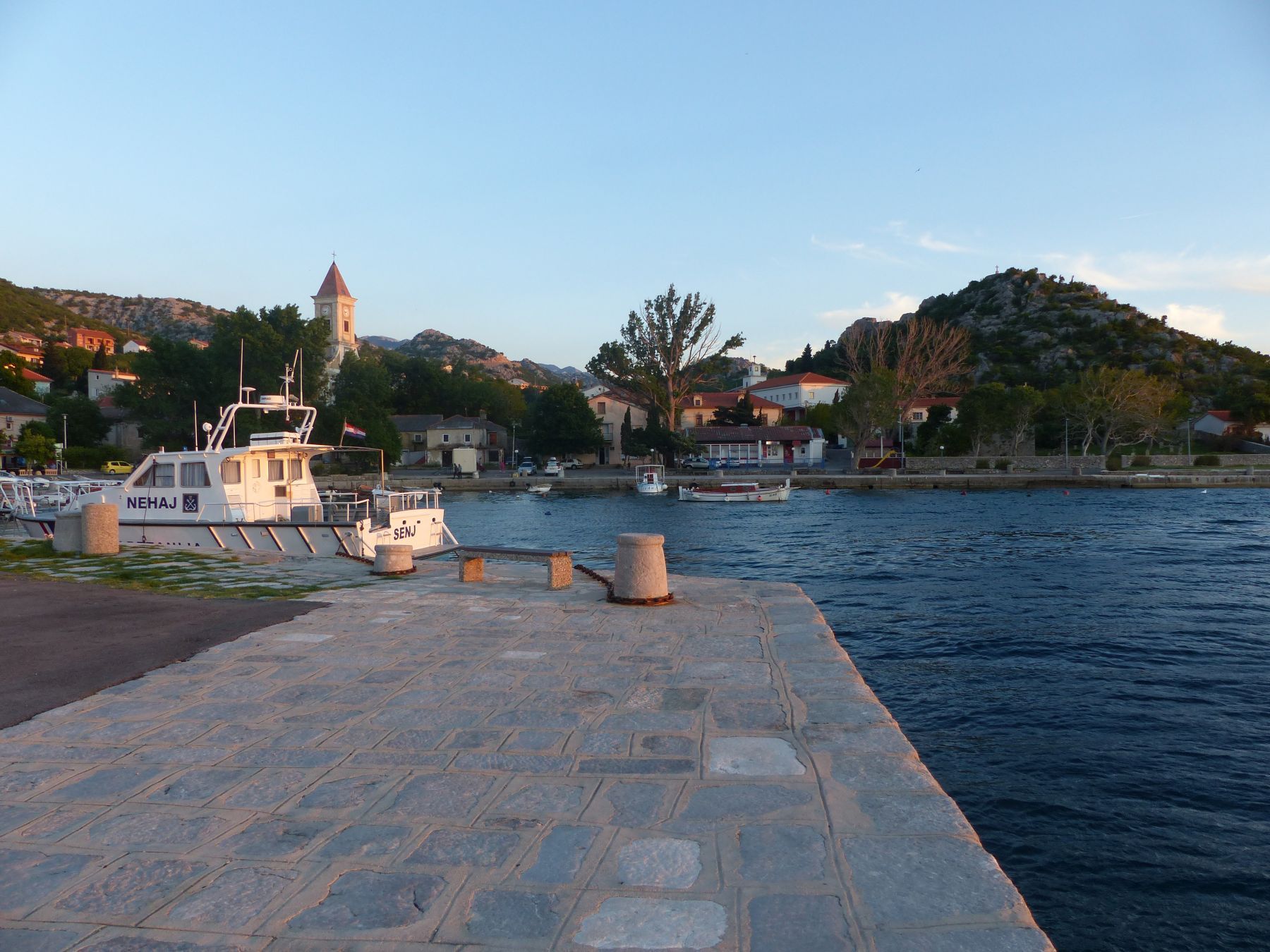

- Location within Croatia
- Coordinates: 44°55′32″N 14°55′08″E
- Country: Croatia
- County: Lika-Senj County
- Municipality: Senj

Area
  - Total: 8.8 km^{2} (3.4 sq mi)

Population (2021)
  - Total: 542
  - Density: 62/km^{2} (160/sq mi)
- Time zone: UTC+1 (CET)
  - Summer (DST): UTC+2 (CEST)

Sveti Juraj is a village in Croatia. It is on the Adriatic coast, on the D8 highway between Senj and Karlobag. A minor road leads inland to the Northern Velebit National Park and the village of Krasno. Offshore from the harbour is a small island called Otočić Lisac.

== Sports ==
The local HPS chapter was called HPD "Zavižan", but it was liquidated on 17 June 1935.

== Notable people ==
- Dragutin Prica, Austro-Hungarian and Yugoslav admiral

== Bibliography ==
=== Dialectology ===
- Crnić Novosel, Mirjana (2019). Štokavski ikavski govori u Gorskome kotaru. ISBN 978-953-7967-81-9.
  - Review: Galović, Filip (2020). "Vrsna monografija o štokavskim ikavskim govorima Gorskoga kotara". Čakavska rič: Polugodišnjak za proučavanje čakavske riječi. 48 (1–2): 161–169. eISSN 1849-1081.
  - Review: Šupljika, Darja (2021). "Štokavske ikavske oaze Gorskoga kotara: Mirjana Crnić Novosel. Štokavski ikavski govori u Gorskome kotaru. Zagreb: Institut za hrvatski jezik i jezikoslovlje, 2019., 242 str". Filologija (76): 268–274. eISSN 1848-8919.
