= Dalmat (yacht) =

Yacht of the Austro-Hungarian Navy

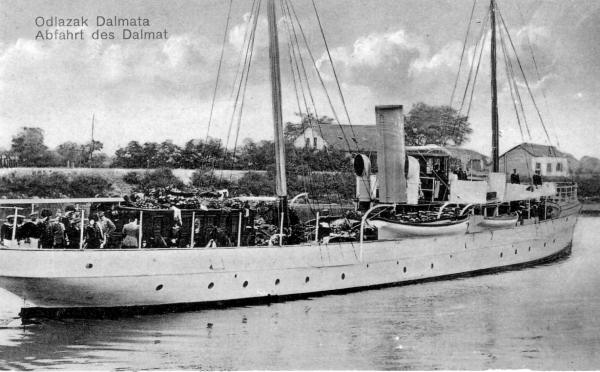
- SMS Dalmat with the coffins of the victims of the Sarajevo assassination on board (1914)

History
- Name: Ossero
- Namesake: Italian name for Osor, Croatia
- Builder: Stabilimento Tecnico Triestino in Trieste
- Launched: 1896
- Out of service: 1899
- Fate: Transferred to Austro-Hungarian Navy

Austria-Hungary
- Name: Ossero (1899–1901); Dalmat (from 1901)
- Namesake: Osor, Croatia (1899–1901); Alternative name for a person of the ancient Dalmatae tribe (from 1901)
- Acquired: 1899
- Out of service: 1920
- Fate: Transferred to the Kingdom of Serbs, Croats and Slovenes (Yugoslavia)

Kingdom of Yugoslavia
- Name: Dalmat
- Namesake: Alternative name for a person of the ancient Dalmatae tribe
- In service: 1920
- Out of service: 1941
- Fate: Captured by Italy

Italy
- Name: Fata
- Namesake: Italian for "fairy"
- Acquired: 1941
- Out of service: 1943
- Fate: Returned to Yugoslavia

Kingdom of Yugoslavia
- Name: Vila
- Namesake: Serbo-Croatian and Slovene for "fairy"
- Acquired: 1943
- Out of service: 1945
- Fate: Transferred to Yugoslav Navy post-war

Socialist Federal Republic of Yugoslavia
- Name: Orjen (1945–1954); Istranka (from 1954)
- Namesake: Orjen mountain range; Slovene or Croatian for a woman from Istria
- Acquired: 1945
- Decommissioned: 1970
- Fate: In private ownership at Split

General characteristics
- Displacement: 260 long tons (260 t)
- Length: 44 m (144 ft 4 in)
- Beam: 6.2 m (20 ft 4 in)
- Height: 3.5 m (11 ft 6 in)
- Installed power: 325 hp (242 kW)
- Speed: 12 knots (22 km/h; 14 mph)

Dalmat was a yacht of the Austro-Hungarian Navy, Royal Yugoslav Navy, Regia Marina and the Yugoslav Navy. Built as Ossero in Trieste in 1896 she was transferred to the Austro-Hungarian Navy in 1899 and in 1901 renamed Dalmat. In 1914 she helped transport Archduke Franz Ferdinand of Austria to Sarajevo. After Ferdinand's assassination she carried his body back to Trieste. Dalmat was transferred to the Royal Yugoslav Navy in 1920 following the Dissolution of Austria-Hungary. She was captured by the Axis in 1941 and served the Italians as Fata. The vessel reverted to the Yugoslav Navy in 1943 following the Armistice of Cassibile and was renamed Vila. She remained in service under the communist government of the Socialist Federal Republic of Yugoslavia, being renamed Orjen in 1945 and Istranka in 1954. Sometime after 1972 she was decommissioned and became a floating restaurant. She was put up for sale in 1998 but lay derelict in a Croatian shipyard until purchased and restored by Italian politician Gianfranco Cozzi. Cozzi was denied permission to sail the vessel from Croatia in 2003. The vessel remains in Split harbour where it has twice sunk due to lack of maintenance.

== Construction ==
The yacht Ossero was ordered by Archduke Charles Stephen of Austria, a nephew of Emperor Franz Joseph I. She was built from Czech-made steel at the San Rocco, Trieste, shipyard of Stabilimento Tecnico Triestino in 1896. She measured 44 metres (144 ft 4 in) in length, 6.2 metres (20 ft 4 in) in width and 3.5 metres (11 ft 6 in) in height. She was fitted with steam propulsion and had a displacement of 260 long tons (260 t). The vessel became the flagship of the Imperial and Royal Yacht Club.

== Military career ==
In 1899 she was transferred to the Austro-Hungarian Navy and, in 1901, was renamed Dalmat. She served as a royal yacht and flagship of the governor of Dalmatia. Dalmat was the first ship in the Adriatic Sea to use wireless telegraphy. The heir to the Austro-Hungarian throne, Archduke Franz Ferdinand of Austria, travelled to Bosnia in 1914. After travelling from Trieste to Ploče aboard the battleship Viribus Unitis he transferred to Dalmat for the journey along the Neretva river to Metković, the smaller vessel being more suited to river travel. Ferdinand completed his onward journey to Sarajevo by train. Ferdinand was assassinated in Sarajevo on 28 June and his body was carried part of the way back to Trieste aboard Dalmat.

Dalmat served in the Austro-Hungarian Navy throughout the First World War. From 26 August 1914 she was based at Zelenika, Montenegro. From 1916 she was a command ship for a submarine force in Kotor. After the post-war Dissolution of Austria-Hungary she was transferred to the Kingdom of Serbs, Croats and Slovenes and served as one of two yachts (the other being Lada) in the Royal Yugoslav Navy (the state was renamed Yugoslavia in 1929). During the Second World War she was captured by Axis forces and from 1941 served in the Regia Marina as Fata. She returned to Yugoslav control after the 1943 Armistice of Cassibile and was renamed Vila. In 1945 Yugoslavia, then under communist control as the Socialist Federal Republic of Yugoslavia, renamed the vessel the Orjen. She was renamed again in 1954, becoming the Istranka. A 1972 edition of Jane's Fighting Ships noted she had a 325-horsepower (242 kW) engine and was capable of 12 knots (22 km/h; 14 mph).

== Later history ==
Istranka was decommissioned in 1970. The vessel was later purchased by the Union Dalmacija company and converted into a floating restaurant, under the same name and moored at Riva quay in Split. She ceased to be used as a restaurant in 1991. Istranka was put up for sale in 1998; she is the last surviving royal yacht of the Habsburg Empire.

After Union Dalmacija went bankrupt in the 1990s the vessel was purchased by Gianfranco Cozzi, a Christian Democrat member of the Italian Parliament, owner of a port services business and collector of naval vessels. He had discovered the vessel lying derelict in a Croatian shipyard and purchased it for €500,000. Cozzi claimed to have spent €5 million on restoring the vessel. Cozzi planned for the vessel to join his collection at Santo Stefano al Mare, but the ship was prevented from leaving the country in 2003 by the Croatian government. The government declared the vessel a national treasure.

Cozzi paid to keep the vessel seaworthy but after his death the maintenance ceased. The vessel sank at her moorings in Split but was recovered on 28 June 2014, despite recovery being complicated by the former yacht's weak structure and a covering of mud. The Croatian Maritime Museum took an interest in the vessel but requests to the Ministry of Culture failed to secure funding and the ship again sank in December 2019. The Maritime Museum made rudimentary repairs to secure the vessel, which remained in the ownership of Cozzi's estate. The estate offered the ship to the Croatian government for €100,000 but this was not progressed as the museum had struggled to raise the funds to make the hull seaworthy. As of 2021, the ship is located in the Kaštela basin of the northern part of the Port of Split.
