= Uskok-class torpedo boat =

Class of Royal Yugoslav Navy motor torpedo boats

- TČ1 Uskok in Royal Yugoslav Navy service

Class overview
- Builders: John I. Thornycroft & Company, United Kingdom
- Operators: Royal Yugoslav Navy; Royal Italian Navy
- Succeeded by: Orjen-class torpedo boat
- Built: 1926–1927
- In commission: 1927–1943
- Completed: 2
- Lost: 1
- Retired: 1

General characteristics
- Displacement: 15 tonnes (14.8 long tons) (standard)
- Length: 18.3 metres (60 ft) (oa)
- Beam: 3.4 m (11 ft 2 in)
- Draught: 1.15–1.3 m (3 ft 9 in – 4 ft 3 in)
- Installed power: 750 brake horsepower (560 kW)
- Propulsion: 2 × shafts; 2 × petrol engines
- Speed: 36–38 knots (67–70 km/h; 41–44 mph) (sea trials)
- Range: 220 nautical miles (410 km; 250 mi) at maximum speed; 800 nmi (1,500 km; 920 mi) at cruising speed of 8 kn (15 km/h; 9.2 mph)
- Complement: Two officers and seven sailors
- Sensors & processing systems: 2 × hydrophones
- Armament: 2 × 456 mm (18 in) torpedoes or; 4 × depth charges; 2 × machine guns (in a twin mount)

The Uskok class (Note: Some sources refer to them as the Uskok class, while others call them the Četnik class.) was a class of two motor torpedo boats built for the Royal Yugoslav Navy (Serbo-Croatian: Kraljevska mornarica; KM) during the late 1920s. Named Uskok and Četnik, the boats were built by the Thornycroft Company based on their existing class of 17-metre-long (55 ft) Coastal Motor Boats, but were almost 1.5 metres (5 ft) longer. As their main armament they were equipped with cradles that carried two British-designed 456-millimetre (18 in) torpedoes, were fitted with hydrophones, and could carry depth charges instead of torpedoes if used in an anti-submarine role. The boats were lightly-built using mahogany, powered by two petrol engines, but lacked transverse bulkheads within the hull to mitigate leaks.

When Yugoslavia entered World War II due to the German-led Axis invasion of the country in April 1941, both boats were captured by Italian forces, after an abortive attempt by one crew to join the fledgling Navy of the Independent State of Croatia. The boats were commissioned in the Royal Italian Navy and operated with a squadron out of the Dalmatian port of Šibenik, where they had been based pre-war. Due to their age and condition they were only used for patrolling and second-line duties. Uskok – by then renamed MAS 1 D – sank near the Dalmatian island of Mljet in July 1942 when its hull failed. Četnik – renamed ME 47 – became non-operational in September 1943, and soon after Italy capitulated her crew escaped and sailed her to Taranto in Allied-occupied southern Italy. The boat survived the war but sources differ on its fate.

== Background, description and construction ==
The Royal Navy (Serbo-Croatian: Kraljevska mornarica; KM) of the Kingdom of Serbs, Croats and Slovenes (from 1929, the Royal Yugoslav Navy) was determined not to repeat the mistake of its predecessor, the Austro-Hungarian Navy, with its late adoption of motor torpedo boats (MTBs). Large numbers of 55-foot-long (17 m) Coastal Motor Boats (CMBs) had been produced in the UK between 1917 and 1922 for the Royal Navy, and they were also sold to overseas customers in the interwar period. In 1926, the KM ordered two MTBs based on John I. Thornycroft & Company's existing class of 55 ft CMBs, but the Yugoslav boats were longer. Some sources refer to them as the Uskok class, named after Croatian corsairs who worked for the Habsburg Empire, while others call them the Četnik class, named for the Serb guerillas of that name.

The boats were built of mahogany, their hulls were rounded at the edges with an almost oblong cross-section, and they were very lightly built. In order to save on weight, they had no transverse bulkheads to mitigate leaks, and the engines and petrol tanks took up the majority of the hull space. This created very uncomfortable conditions for the engine-room crew due to the noise and lack of space. An open cockpit for steering was located amidships, and immediately fore and aft of it were columns on which twin machine guns could be mounted. Two torpedoes could be carried in open cradles aft of the cockpit.

The boats were 18.3 m (60 ft) in length overall and 16.7 m (54 ft 9 in) between perpendiculars, and a beam of 3.4 m (11 ft 2 in)/ They had a normal draught of 0.58 m (1 ft 11 in), and a maximum draught at full load of 1.15–1.30 m (3 ft 9 in – 4 ft 3 in). Their standard displacement was 15 tonnes (14.8 long tons). They each had two Thornycroft V12 petrol engines installed, the forward one driving the starboard propeller shaft and the aft engine driving the port shaft, with the rudder placed immediately aft of the propellers. The engines were rated at 375 brake horsepower (280 kW) each, for a total power output of 750 brake horsepower (560 kW), and were designed to propel the boats to a top speed of 37–40 knots (69–74 km/h; 43–46 mph), although a maximum speed of 36–38 kn (67–70 km/h; 41–44 mph) was achieved during sea trials in 1927. An auxiliary 4-cylinder petrol engine, coupled to the port shaft, was fitted for cruising, at a speed of up to 8 kn (15 km/h; 9.2 mph). The boats had a range of 220 nautical miles (410 km; 250 mi) at maximum speed, and 800 nmi (1,500 km; 920 mi) at cruising speed. They carried 1.15–1.60 tonnes (1.13–1.57 long tons) of fuel.

The main armament for the boats was two British-made forward-facing 456 mm (18 in) torpedoes. To conduct a torpedo attack, the boat would be aligned with the target, the torpedo engines would be started, and the torpedoes would be pushed over the stern by a 3-metre-long (9 ft 10 in) mechanical rod, after which the boat would immediately turn to the side and the torpedo would proceed towards the target. Only four torpedoes were delivered with the boats, which were to be used for both training – with an inert warhead – and in combat with a live warhead. The torpedoes had two speed settings, which determined range. At 35 kn (65 km/h; 40 mph) they had a range of 2,300 m (2,500 yd), and 3,650 m (3,990 yd) at 29 kn (54 km/h; 33 mph). They had a 145-kilogram (320 lb) TNT warhead. For anti-aircraft and close defence purposes, a pair of 7.7-millimetre (.303 in) Lewis machine guns on a twin mount were carried, which could be attached to the columns either forward or aft of the cockpit as needed. The boats were equipped with two hydrophones for anti-submarine duties, and carried four depth charges instead of torpedoes in this role. Each boat had a crew of two officers and seven sailors.

Both boats were laid down on 15 September 1926 and launched in May 1927. They were commissioned into the KM as torpedo boats, Serbo-Croatian: torpedni čamci, TČ, named Uskok (TČ1) and Četnik (TČ2). Initial exercises with the boats were delayed to await the return of their commanding officer from training in the UK. There were also some concerns that the Mediterranean sun could warp their hulls, and precautions were put in place to cope with this. It appears that after the two boats were commissioned, plans to order more were shelved due to a combination of negative assessments of the boats during their sea trials and the training of crew members, and the advent of the Great Depression in 1929, which meant funds would probably not be available in subsequent years for further acquisitions.

By 1941, the maximum speed that could be achieved by boats of the class had decreased to 30–32 kn (56–59 km/h; 35–37 mph), and while in Italian service the auxiliary engine could only achieve 4.5 kn (8.3 km/h; 5.2 mph). The Italians installed a rack over the starboard torpedo cradle on each boat with a capacity of ten 50 kg (110 lb) depth charges, in place of the starboard torpedo.

== Service history ==
Between their commissioning and the outbreak of World War II in 1939, the two boats of the class participated in several naval exercises. On one such training exercise a torpedo was lost from Četnik, and until 1941 she only carried one. After eight German-built Orjen-class torpedo boats joined the fleet between 1936 and 1939, the Uskok-class boats combined with them to form the KM's 2nd Torpedo Division based at Šibenik. They were deployed there when the German-led Axis invasion of Yugoslavia commenced on 6 April 1941, with Uskok under the command of poručnik bojnog broda (Lieutenant Commander) Stanislav Štiglič, with Četnik under the command of poručnik bojnog broda Branislav Popović. During the invasion, Uskok patrolled between Šibenik and Milna on the island of Brač, but was seized by the Italians at Šibenik when the Yugoslavs surrendered to the Axis on 17 April 1941. Četnik sailed to Divulje near Split – by Popović's second-in-command, poručnik fregate (Lieutenant) Velimir Škorpik – ostensibly to join the nascent Navy of the Independent State of Croatia (Croatian: Ratna Mornarica Nezavisne Države Hrvatske, RMNDH). On arrival at Divulje he intentionally rammed the wharf in order to damage the boat, which was seized by the Italians soon after. Škorpik joined the RMNDH, becoming the harbour master at Makarska, but defected to the Yugoslav Partisans in September 1943. Hoping to be appointed as the commander-in-chief of the Partisan Navy, he later transferred to the Partisan's land forces and was killed under unclear circumstances.

Uskok and Četnik were commissioned in the Royal Italian Navy as MAS 1 D and MAS 2 D respectively, with MAS standing for Motoscafo Armato Silurante ('Torpedo Armed Motorboat') and the prefix D denoting they were captured in Dalmatia. Both were allocated to the 25ª Squadriglia MAS (25th Squadron MAS) based at Šibenik. Due to their age and poor condition, they were only used for patrol and second-line duties. MAS 1 D was sent to Piraeus in Greece for a short time, but the wear and tear of the long voyage weakened her hull. She was lost on 19 April 1942 in heavy seas near the island of Mljet after the rivets in her hull plating failed due to engine vibrations. She sprang a leak and sank quickly due to the lack of transverse bulkheads in her hull. MAS 2 D was redesignated MS 47, standing for Motosilurante ('Torpedo Boat') in July 1942, and allocated to the 7ª Squadriglia MAS (7th Squadron MAS). On 1 September 1943, MS 47 was re-designated ME 47, with the "E" in ME standing for "not fully operational". When the Italians capitulated the following week, ME 47 was based at the Bay of Kotor in the Italian-annexed Province of Cattaro. On the evening of 11 September, her crew escaped by sailing ME 47 to Taranto in Allied-occupied southern Italy. She survived the remainder of the war, and after it ended she was found to be in a "very bad shape". Naval historians differ on her fate, with Maurizio Brescia stating she was restored to the Yugoslavs in 1945, and Zvonimir Freivogel stating she was broken up by the Italians either soon after the war or in the early 1950s.

== See also ==
- List of ships of the Royal Yugoslav Navy
