= Vrgada =

Island in Croatia

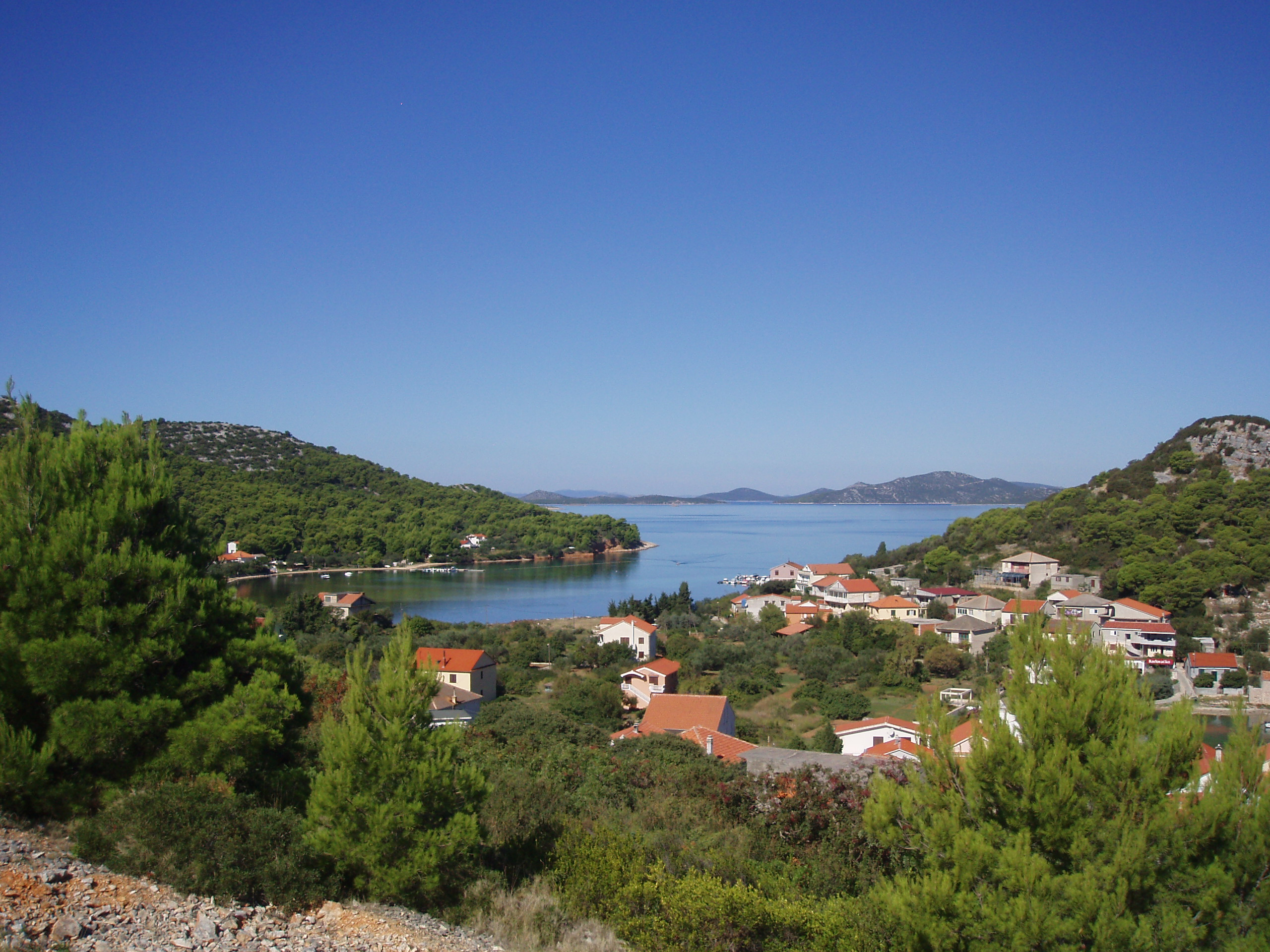

- Location within Croatia
- Interactive map of Vrgada

Geography
- Location: Adriatic Sea
- Coordinates: 43.852231°N 15.50231°E
- Area: 3.7 km^{2} (1.4 sq mi)
- Highest elevation: 112 m (367 ft)
- Highest point: Srabljinovac

Administration
- Croatia
- County: Zadar County

Demographics
- Population: 249
- Pop. density: 67.29/km^{2} (174.28/sq mi)

Vrgada (Croatian pronunciation: [vř̩ɡaːda]) is an island off the coast of Croatia in the Adriatic Sea. It is located halfway between Zadar and Šibenik, in the archipelago northwest of Murter and south of Biograd na moru, 2.5 nautical miles (4.6 km) from the mainland. It has area of 3.7 square kilometres (1 square mile). and population of 249. The only settlement on the island is also named Vrgada and is surrounded with pine forest. Main industries are agriculture and fishing. On northeast coast, there are several small coves.
