= Ivan Kern =

Yugoslavian naval officer (1898-1991)

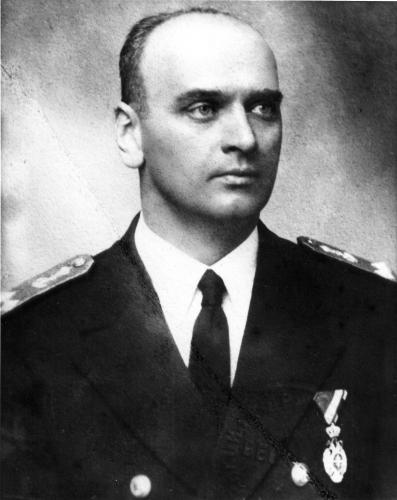
Ivan Kern

Ivan Kern (3 October 1898 - 26 June 1991) was a Slovene naval officer who led two Yugoslav torpedo boats to escape capture and join the British Royal Navy when the Axis invasion of Yugoslavia occurred in April 1941 during World War II. At the end of the war he was promoted to the rank of rear admiral by Josip Broz Tito.

Before the outbreak of World War II he was a Kapetan bojnog broda (naval captain) and commanded a division of torpedo boats. On 16 April, during the invasion of Yugoslavia, he left the Bay of Kotor with the torpedo boats Durmitor and Kajmakčalan and joined the Royal Navy in Alexandria.

When the Yugoslav government-in-exile was formed in London, he was appointed as head of the Department of the Navy in the Ministry of Transport. He was later involved in the negotiations for the transfer of the vessels of the Royal Yugoslav Navy to the Yugoslav Navy of Josip Broz Tito's Partisans. These talks were held on the island of Vis. Tito promoted him to Kontraadmiral (rear admiral) in 1945, and he retired from service on 22 December 1945.
