= Royal Yugoslav Navy =

1921–1945 maritime warfare branch of Yugoslavia's military

Royal Navy
- Kraljevska mornarica Краљевска морнарица
- Active: 1921–1945
- Country: Yugoslavia
- Type: Navy
- Role: Coastal defence
- Size: 41 combatants 19 auxiliaries 150 seaplanes (1941)
- Part of: Royal Yugoslav Armed Forces
- Engagements: World War II: Invasion of Yugoslavia

Commanders
- Commander of the Navy: See list
- Notable commanders: Dragutin Prica

Insignia
- Naval ensign (1922–1941)

- Naval ensign (1918–1922)

The Royal Navy (Serbo-Croatian Latin: Kraljevska mornarica; Serbo-Croatian Cyrillic: Краљевска морнарица; КМ), commonly known as the Royal Yugoslav Navy, was the naval warfare service branch of the Kingdom of Yugoslavia (originally called the Kingdom of Serbs, Croats and Slovenes). It was brought into existence in 1921, and initially consisted of a few former Austro-Hungarian Navy vessels surrendered at the conclusion of World War I and transferred to the new nation state under the terms of the Treaty of Saint-Germain-en-Laye. The only modern sea-going warships transferred to the new state were twelve steam-powered torpedo boats, although it did receive four capable river monitors for use on the Danube and other large rivers. Significant new acquisitions began in 1926 with a former German light cruiser, followed by the commissioning of two motor torpedo boats (MTBs) and a small submarine flotilla over the next few years. When the name of the state was changed to Yugoslavia in 1929, the name of its navy was changed to reflect this. In the late 1920s, several of the original vessels were discarded.

Throughout the interwar period, elements of the fleet conducted visits to ports throughout the Mediterranean, but few fleet exercises occurred due to budget pressures. In 1930, the Maritime Air Force was divorced from Royal Yugoslav Army control, and the naval air arm began to develop significantly, including the establishment of bases along the Adriatic coast. The following year, a British-made flotilla leader was commissioned with the idea that the KM might be able to operate in the Mediterranean alongside the British and French navies. In the same year, five locally-built minelayers were added to the fleet. A hiatus of several years followed, and it was not until 1936 that any further major acquisitions were made, with the purchase of eight German-built MTBs. Over the next two years, the fleet was significantly strengthened by the acquisition of three French-designed destroyers, marking the high point of Yugoslav naval strength. On the eve of World War II, the navy consisted of 611 officers and 8,562 men, operating 41 combatant ships and 19 auxiliaries.

While the KM was largely captured by Italian forces during the German-led Axis invasion of Yugoslavia in April 1941, a few of its vessels, aircraft and their crews escaped and served in the Mediterranean under Royal Navy control during the remainder of World War II. When the Italians sued for peace in September 1943, most of the remaining vessels were taken over by the German Kriegsmarine or the Navy of the Independent State of Croatia. Towards the end of the war, the Allies transferred a corvette to Yugoslav control. At the end of the war, the few remaining vessels were transferred to the control of the new Federal People's Republic of Yugoslavia. As the post-war Yugoslav Navy drew its lineage from the naval forces of the wartime Yugoslav Partisans rather than the KM, few of the customs and traditions of the KM survived in the successor force.

== History ==
=== Origins ===
In mid-to-late 1918, as World War I drew to a close, the Austro-Hungarian Empire began to break apart, and local committees began assuming responsibility for administration from the central government. In October 1918, the self-proclaimed National Council of Slovenes, Croats and Serbs was established in Zagreb, and later that month there were discussions between the Austro-Hungarian Navy and representatives of the National Council regarding the future of the Austro-Hungarian fleet. There was even an exchange of delegates between the National Council and the Austro-Hungarian naval staff in Vienna. By the end of that month, the "sailor's councils" that had been formed aboard Austro-Hungarian warships at the main base of Pola had decided that they would leave their ships by 1 November, regardless of the political discussions that were ongoing. On 30 October, the Austro-Hungarian naval staff directed its commanders to hand over all naval and riverine vessels to representatives of the National Council. The following day, the Emperor Charles ordered the handover of all naval vessels, establishments and fortresses to the National Council. By 4:30 pm that day, the orders had been carried out. The National Council appointed Rear Admiral Dragutin Prica as the Navy Commissioner and Captain Janko Vuković de Podkapelski as fleet commander.

The Italians were extremely uneasy about the rise of a new naval power in the Adriatic Sea, and on the night of 31 October, two Royal Italian Navy personnel penetrated the base at Pola and set naval mines under the keel of SMS Viribus Unitis, the 20,000-long-ton (22,000-short-ton) dreadnought battleship which was also Vuković's flagship. When it exploded, the ship sank, with the loss of 400 crew, including Vuković. As Prica was ill, the National Council appointed Captain Metodije Koch as Navy Commissioner and promoted him to rear admiral on 2 November. The Armistice of Villa Giusti between the Allies, the United States and Austria-Hungary was signed on 3 November, and came into force the following day. Its naval provisions included a requirement that Austria-Hungary hand over the bulk of its naval vessels to Allied and United States control and disarm the remainder. Included in the handover were 42 modern warships and submarines. Italy immediately began to occupy the former Austro-Hungarian coast and offshore islands, and demanded the handover of the vessels then under the control of the National Council. Koch requested authority to retain control over four destroyers, but this was denied by the Allied Naval Council. Later that month, the Italians convinced the Allied Naval Council to force the remaining crews off most of the vessels.

On 1 December 1918, the new South Slav state, the Kingdom of Serbs, Croats and Slovenes (KSCS, later Kingdom of Yugoslavia) was created, joining the Kingdom of Serbia with those South Slav lands formerly part of the Austro-Hungarian Empire. Later that month, the Serbian Ministry of Army was dissolved, and a new Ministry of Army and Navy was created. By January 1919, there were a total of 35 former Austro-Hungarian vessels in port which had a total of 600 Yugoslav crew members aboard. The National Council dissolved the Navy Commissioner's office in February and Koch was appointed as the head of the Navy Department within the Ministry of Army and Navy. During that month, the Italians finally disembarked all remaining crew from former Austro-Hungarian vessels, leaving the nascent KSCS Navy without any ships. In April, Koch's office was moved to the capital, Belgrade. The final fate of the former Austro-Hungarian vessels was determined by the Allied powers during the Paris Peace Conference, which also decided territorial disagreements between Italy and the KSCS. While the territorial questions in Dalmatia were largely decided in favour of the KSCS, Italy was more successful in denying the KSCS most of the former Austro-Hungarian fleet. The unrealistic demands of the KSCS in this regard contributed to their lack of success. For example, in April 1919, the KSCS asked for control over four cruisers, 17 destroyers, 27 ocean-going torpedo boats, and 20 submarines. Rebuffed, in May 1920 the KSCS reduced its claims to two ageing cruisers, six destroyers, 24 torpedo boats and four submarines. Even this more modest demand was rejected.

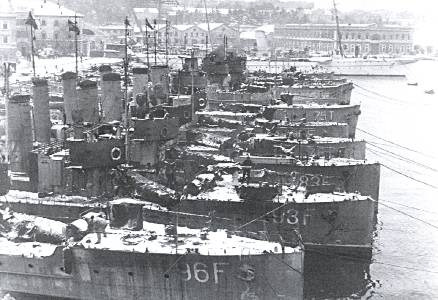
Eight 250t-class torpedo boats were transferred to the Navy of the Kingdom of Serbs, Croats and Slovenes in March 1921

In October 1920, the question was finally settled when the Treaty of Saint-Germain-en-Laye provided for the transfer of the obsolete coastal defence ship SMS Kronprinz Erzherzog Rudolf, eight 250t-class torpedo boats, four older Kaiman-class torpedo boats, the repair ship Cyclop, the water carriers Najade and Nixe, the salvage vessel Gigant, three tugs, the yacht Dalmat, four hulks, four river monitors (Bosna, Enns, Körös and Bodrog), one motor launch, three river tugs, 16 small tenders, and a significant number of coal and oil lighters. All of these vessels were formally taken over by the KSCS at the beginning of March 1921. As the only modern sea-going vessels left to the KSCS were the 12 torpedo boats, the new nation had to build its naval forces from scratch.

=== Establishment ===
Many former Austro-Hungarian naval personnel were incorporated into the new navy, 90 per cent of whom were of Croatian or Slovene ethnicity. The remainder were Serbs, or non-Slavs such as Germans. Their former ranks were recognised and, initially at least, rank insignia and regulations were adopted from the former Austro-Hungarian Navy. By 1922, the KM consisted of 124 officers and about 3,000 men. The number of officers had more than halved since the end of 1919, largely due to disillusionment. To fill the looming shortfall, around 20 graduates from each of the 1921 and 1922 classes of the Yugoslav Military Academy in Belgrade were sent to the KM. In 1923, the new Naval Academy at Gruž accepted its first class of 40 midshipmen, who were to undergo a three-year training course. All entrants to the Naval Academy had to be between 17 and 20 years of age, and graduates of high school or similar nautical school. Two specialist schools for petty officers were established, one at Šibenik for deck crew, and a machinist's school at Kumbor in the Bay of Kotor. Mine and torpedo training was conducted at Đenovići, as was pilot and air observer training. A gunnery school was established at Meljine in the Bay of Kotor. Šibenik was also the home of the main coastal radio station, the signals school and the basic and specialist training school for seamen.

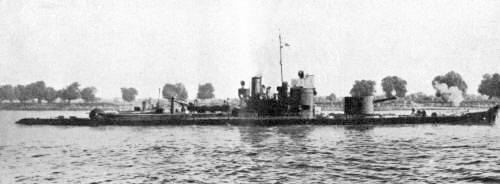
The river monitor Vardar underway

In September 1923, new regulations were promulgated, dividing the navy into a fleet, a river flotilla, and naval aviation. Later that month a Naval Command was established, based in Zemun, near Belgrade. The Navy Department, now known as Navy Section, was then only responsible for purely administrative matters, with Naval Command responsible for all operational questions. The service's initially unrealistic expansion goals of 24 destroyers and 24 submarines were soon shelved, and by the end of 1923 the fleet consisted of eight 250t-class torpedo boats, four Kaiman-class torpedo boats, six Galeb-class minelayers, four Schichau-class minesweepers, the water carrier Perun (ex-Cyclop), the yachts Vila (ex-Dalmat) and Lada (ex-Quarnero), the training ship Vila Velebit, the salvage vessel Moćni (ex-Gigant), and four tugs. Kumbor (ex-Kronprinz Erzherzog Rudolf) had been sold for scrap in 1922, and three of the minesweepers were disposed of in 1924, as were the four hulks. The four river monitors remained in service, as Vardar, Drava, Morava and Sava respectively. They were supported by two motor patrol boats and three river tugs.

The shore establishments were developed from those inherited from the Austro-Hungarian Navy, and included Tivat in the Bay of Kotor. It was home to the Tivat Arsenal, a naval yard which was expanded to repair and overhaul larger vessels; it included two floating docks, one of 2,000 long tons (2,032 t) and one of 7,000-long-ton (7,100 t) capacity. The apprentice school and diving school were also established there, along with the main supply base. A 2000-long ton-capacity floating dock was acquired for the private Yarrow Adriatic shipyard at Kraljevica, and a subsidiary of the French Ateliers et Chantiers de la Loire shipyard was established at Split, equipped with two more floating docks, one of 1,800-long-ton (1,829 t), and one of 8,000-long-ton (8,100 t) capacity. The riverine vessels were usually repaired at the Novi Sad subsidiary of the Arsenal, and overhauls were completed at Sartid Works in Smederevo.

=== Interwar activities ===
==== 1923–1929 ====
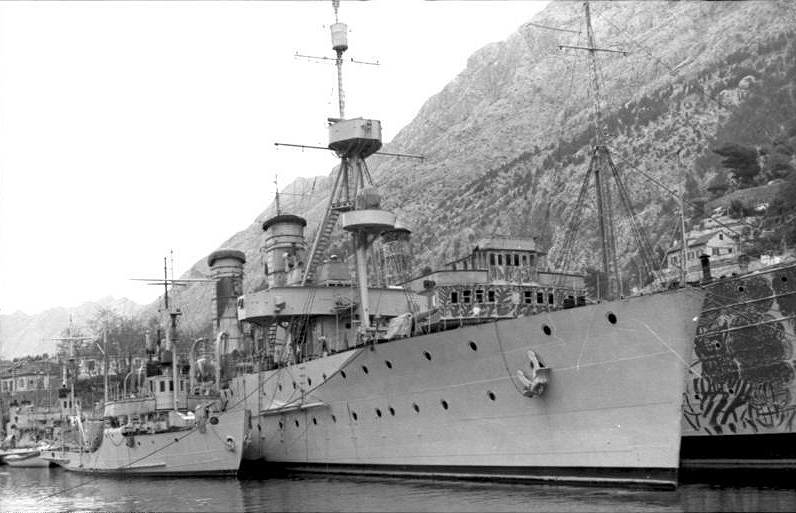
The first major acquisition of the navy was the light cruiser Dalmacija (right)

The early development of the navy was hampered by severe budget limitations and a lack of interest from the general staff which consisted of former Royal Serbian Army generals with little appreciation for naval matters. Jadranska straža (lit. 'Adriatic Guard') association was established to promote public interest in the navy. In 1925, Prica conducted exercises off the Dalmatian coast, involving the majority of vessels. In 1926, the navy was able to make its first significant acquisition, the former Imperial German Navy light cruiser SMS Niobe, which was renamed Dalmacija. She was refitted at the Tivat Arsenal prior to commissioning. The following year, two British-built Thornycroft Uskok-class motor torpedo boats (MTBs) were acquired, named Uskok and Četnik, and a base was built for them at Šibenik. In 1927, the first two submarines were purchased, the British-built Hrabri class—Hrabri and Nebojša. Over the next two years, two further submarines were brought into service, the French-built Osvetnik class, which consisted of Osvetnik and Smeli. The submarine flotilla was based at Tivat, supported by the depot ship Hvar (ex-Solun), acquired in 1927. Between 1928 and 1930, a number of former Austro-Hungarian vessels were discarded, including the four Kaiman-class torpedo boats. In 1929, the salvage ship Moćni was scrapped, and the German-built 740-long-ton (830-short-ton) Spasilac was acquired to replace her.

In late 1928, the naval aviation school was transferred from Đenovići to Divulje near Split, where a new seaplane station was established. In the same year, the 1,870-long-ton (2,090-short-ton) seaplane depot ship Zmaj was acquired from Germany. In May and June 1929, a squadron, under the command of Prica and consisting of Dalmacija, Hvar and the two Hrabri-class submarines, visited Malta, Corfu and Bizerte. Also in 1929, the former Austro-Hungarian water carrier Najade, now named Sitnica, was re-employed as an auxiliary for the submarine flotilla, despite its lack of a workshop for repair work. In late 1929, Navy Command and Navy Section were combined as part of the Ministry of Army and Navy, with the navy commander holding the rank of admiral, and his deputy with the rank of vice-admiral. By that time, the Yugoslav fleet consisted of the light cruiser Dalmacija, the eight 250t-class seagoing torpedo boats, the two Uskok-class MTBs, four submarines, six Galeb-class minetenders, one minesweeper, the submarine depot ship Hvar, the training ship Sitnica, two yachts Vila and Lada, and five tugs. The riverine flotilla consisted of the four monitors and the river auxiliary Srbija. In total, the navy comprised 256 officers and 2,000 men, with a naval reserve consisting of 164 officers and 570 men. Less than half of the officers were former members of the Austro-Hungarian Navy, and 49 officers had graduated from the Naval Academy. In October, Prica retired as navy commander and was replaced by Vice-Admiral V. Wickerhauser.

==== 1930–1940 ====
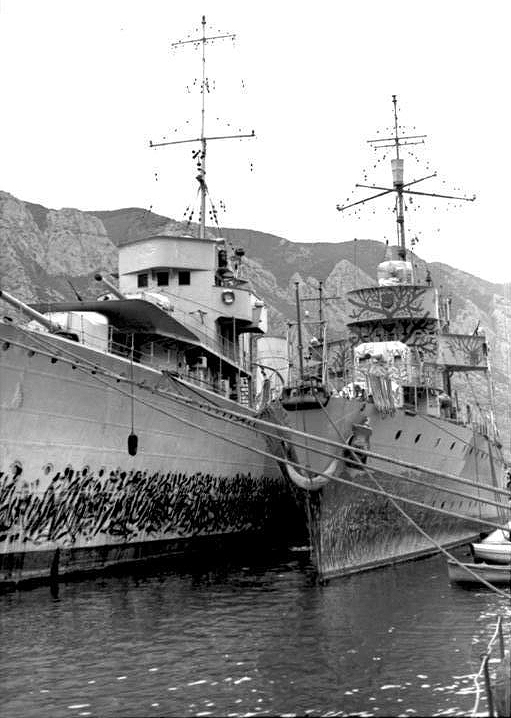
The flotilla leader Dubrovnik (left) at the Bay of Kotor

In January 1929, King Alexander changed the name of the country to the Kingdom of Yugoslavia, and the navy became the Royal Navy (Serbo-Croatian Latin: Kraljevska Mornarica, Краљевска Морнарица, KM). In April 1930, the salvage vessel Spasilac was added to the fleet, and the following month the submarine Nebojša was damaged when she collided with a steamer. In July, the two Hrabri-class submarines and Sitnica made a Mediterranean cruise, visiting Alexandria and Beirut. The appointment of a chief of the Maritime Air Force in 1930 signified the separation of naval aviation from army control, with a strength of around 1,000 officers and men, of whom about 80 were pilots. Around 120 naval aircraft were in service. In 1931, the fleet expanded significantly with the completion of the British-built flotilla leader Dubrovnik. The flotilla leader concept involved building large destroyers similar to the World War I Royal Navy V and W-class destroyers. In the interwar French Navy, these ships were known as contre-torpilleurs, and were intended to operate with smaller destroyers, or as half-flotillas of three ships. The KM decided to build three such flotilla leaders, ships that would have the ability to reach high speeds and with a long endurance. The long endurance requirement reflected Yugoslav plans to deploy the ships into the central Mediterranean, where they would be able to operate alongside French and British warships. The onset of the Great Depression meant that only one ship of the planned half-flotilla was ever built. Five locally-built Malinska-class minelayers were also added to the fleet in 1931. The following year, a new German-built 720-long-ton (810-short-ton) brigantine sail training ship, Jadran was acquired, and Wickerhauser retired and was replaced by Vice-Admiral N.N. Stanković. The 250t-class torpedo boat T4 ran aground and was broken up in 1932.

In 1932, Stanković assured the British naval attaché that Yugoslav naval policy was focused on the defence of her coastline, but he also opined that this task would require significant expansion of the navy, including the acquisition of six cruisers and five more flotilla leaders similar to Dubrovnik. In the same year, Dubrovnik sailed to the Black Sea then visited several ports in the Mediterranean with King Alexander and Queen Marie aboard. During 1932, the Maritime Air Force had bases at Divulje and Đenovići, with two bomber squadrons and one reconnaissance squadron at each base, each squadron consisting of 12 aircraft. In 1934, the British naval attaché reported that the French had significant influence on Yugoslav naval policy. In the same year, the KM comprised 517 officers and 6,461 men, and Stanković retired and was replaced by Rear-Admiral M. L. Polić. In October, Hrabri and Smeli conducted visits to various Mediterranean ports. Despite the fact that a half-flotilla of large destroyers was not going to be built, the idea that Dubrovnik might operate with a number of smaller destroyers persisted. In 1934, the KM decided to acquire three such destroyers to operate in a division led by Dubrovnik. In August 1935, Dubrovnik visited Corfu and Bizerte, the seaplane carrier Zmaj along with three Galeb-class mine tenders also visited Corfu, and Hrabri and Osvetnik visited Malta.

In 1936, eight German-built Orjen-class MTBs were added. Also in 1936, a new naval coastal command was established under the command of a rear admiral. It was headquartered in Split, and included shore-based commands at Selce, Šibenik and Đenovići. By the end of that year, the KM consisted of 27 surface combatants, four submarines, and around a dozen auxiliary vessels, crewed by a total of 487 officers and about 5,000 men. The yacht Lada had been disposed of, as had the minesweeper D2. (Note: The naval historian Milan Vego provides conflicting information regarding the fate of minesweeper D2. He states that it was disposed of by 1936, but also lists it as part of the fleet in 1941. Leo Niehorster lists D2 as still in service in 1941, but notes it was being used as a training ship.) The training ship Sitnica had been converted into a second submarine depot ship, and the Galeb-class mine tenders had been reclassified as minelayers. The river flotilla consisted of the four monitors, the royal yacht Dragor, two patrol boats—Graničar and Stražar, and three river tugs; Cer, Triglav and Avala. However, in 1936 the only vessels ready for war service were Dubrovnik and the four submarines, and the navy was only considered capable of patrol duties and coastal surveillance, minelaying and minor raids against enemy shipping. Despite this, the United States naval attaché observed that the morale and discipline of the navy was very good. He further stated that higher-level commanders appeared discouraged at the poor position of the navy due to its inadequate budget. He concluded that the fleet was in very good condition considering its funding. During 1936, Nebojša and Osvetnik visited Corfu, and Zmaj and three Galeb-class mine tenders also visited Corfu.

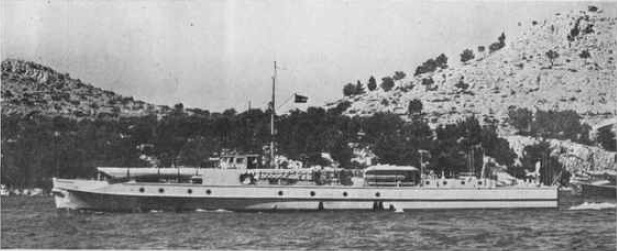
The Orjen-class MTB Velebit underway

In 1936–1937, the fleet was significantly strengthened by the acquisition of three 1,240-long-ton (1,390-short-ton) Beograd-class destroyers, the French-built Beograd, and the locally-built Zagreb and Ljubljana. Naval communication via teletype was established to connect Naval Command in Zemun with bases at Selce, Split, Šibenik and Novi Sad. Split was also connected to Divulje, and Đenovići was connected with the Tivat Arsenal. In 1937, the Naval Command was renamed the Naval Staff, and a Naval Staff College was established at Dubrovnik. Considerable effort was made to bring the fleet to sound seagoing condition, with a refit of Dalmacija. Dubrovnik was considered to be in good repair, but the two French-built submarines needed constant work. The eight new Orjen-class MTBs were found to be unseaworthy in rough conditions, but satisfactory in fair weather. Dubrovnik visited Istanbul, Mudros and Piraeus in August, and Zmaj, Hrabri and Smeli visited Crete, Piraeus and Corfu in August and September.

In 1938, the navy consisted of 611 officers and 8,562 men. A Balkan Naval Conference was conducted in the same year, during which the Chief of the Naval Staff declared that in case of war, the Yugoslav fleet would concentrate on coastal defence, except for occasional submarine forays. The Maritime Air Force could field a total of 40 aircraft, but only the 12 Dornier Do 22s and 12 Dornier Do Js were considered to be of any value in modern warfare. Dubrovnik visited Alexandria, Beirut and Corfu in August 1938. In 1939, a new 2,400-long-ton (2,700-short-ton) destroyer Split was laid down, and two coastal German Type IIB submarines were ordered, but due to the outbreak of World War II, Split was not completed and the submarines were never delivered. In 1939, the British observed that the commander-in-chief of the Yugoslav Navy, Polić, was "amiable but ignorant" and had little technical knowledge regarding naval matters. In the same year, the 250t-class torpedo boat T2 was broken up for scrap. In January 1940, Ljubljana struck a reef off Šibenik and sank. She was raised and placed in dry dock at the Tivat Arsenal for repairs.

=== Prior to the April 1941 invasion ===
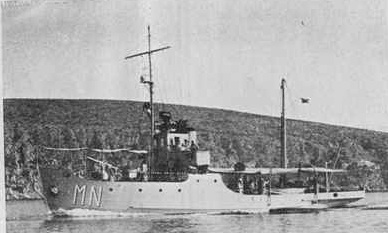
A Malinska-class minelayer underway

On the eve of the German-led Axis invasion of Yugoslavia, the KM comprised 41 combatant ships and 19 auxiliaries, effectively divided into ships capable of offensive and defensive tasks, and ships intended for peacetime training, logistics and minelaying tasks. The former category included Dubrovnik, the three Beograd-class destroyers (although Ljubljana was in dry dock being repaired), the four submarines, eight Orjen-class MTBs and two Uskok-class MTBs. Of the submarines, only the two French-built ones were considered fully combat-ready. The latter category consisted of Dalmacija, six Galeb-class minelayers, six 250t-class torpedo boats, five Malinska-class minelayers, and the training and auxiliary ships Jadran, Zmaj, Hvar and Sitnica. The Maritime Air Force consisted of 150 seaplanes, of which 120 were combat-capable, the remainder being training aircraft. The combat aircraft were mainly Do 22s, Do Js and Do D types. Although torpedo-capable aircraft were in service, no air-launched torpedoes were available.

There were significant command and control weaknesses in the KM prior to the invasion. One was the failure to subordinate the Naval Surveillance Command to respective sectors of Naval Coastal Command, and another was giving responsibility for two sectors of Naval Coastal Command to what were essentially training establishments.

=== Naval operations during the invasion of 1941 ===
When Germany and Italy attacked Yugoslavia on 6 April 1941, the initial attacks came from the air. From early morning, Italian and German aircraft attacked the naval facilities at Split and the Bay of Kotor. In the afternoon, Italian dive bombers attacked the Bay of Kotor. Their attack damaged a Do J flying boat, but one of the Italian aircraft was shot down by anti-aircraft fire, while another two were damaged. Shortly after this more Italian bombers unsuccessfully attacked the Tivat Arsenal, suffering three aircraft damaged in the attack. On the same day, three KM Dornier Do 22s and Rogožarski SIM-XIV-Hs provided air cover while the Galeb-class minelayer Jastreb laid a minefield off Budva harbour. The following day, three Italian bombers became lost in cloud and emerged over the Bay of Kotor where two were damaged and one shot down by anti-aircraft fire. On 8 April, there were Italian attacks on the base of the 2nd and 3rd Torpedo Divisions in Šibenik, and three Do J flying boats were destroyed by Italian fighters at Jadrtovac. A number of Do 22s and SIM-XIV-Hs also flew reconnaissance missions on that day. The next day, Italian bombers struck a number of Yugoslav naval and seaplane bases along the coast, destroying and damaging several aircraft. One Do 22 pilot located an Italian convoy crossing the Adriatic and despite heavy anti-aircraft fire attacked it twice without result. Another three KM Do 22s raided Durazzo in Italian-controlled Albania, but were driven off.

To prevent a bridgehead being established at Zara, an Italian enclave on the Dalmatian coast, Beograd, four 250t-class torpedo boats and six MTBs were dispatched to Šibenik, 80 kilometres (50 mi) to the south of Zara, in preparation for an attack. The attack was to be coordinated with the 12th Infantry Division Jadranska and two combined regiments (Serbo-Croatian Latin: odredi) of the Royal Yugoslav Army attacking from the Benkovac area, supported by the Royal Yugoslav Air Force's 81st Bomber Group. The Yugoslavs launched their attack on 9 April, but the naval prong of this attack faltered when Beograd was damaged by near misses from Italian aircraft off Šibenik with her starboard engine was put out of action, after which she limped to the Bay of Kotor, escorted by the remainder of the force, for repairs. The Italian aerial bombardment of Kotor badly damaged the minelayer Kobac, which had to be beached to prevent its sinking.

On 10 April, the 2nd Hydroplane Command at Divulje began to disintegrate, with some pilots flying their aircraft to the Bay of Kotor to join the 3rd Hydroplane Command. One Do 22 attacked an Italian tanker off Bari, claiming a near miss that the Yugoslav crew believed to have caused some damage. The following day, Italian dive bombers attacked MTBs of the 2nd Torpedo Division near Šibenik, with the Yugoslav boats shooting down one Italian aircraft and damaging another.

At the start of the campaign, the river monitors had carried out offensive operations by shelling the airfield at Mohács in Hungary on 6 April and again two days later, but had to begin withdrawing towards Novi Sad by 11 April after coming under repeated attack by German dive bombers. Early in the morning of 12 April, a squadron of German dive bombers attacked the Yugoslav monitors on the Danube. Drava was hit by several of them but they were unable to penetrate her 300-millimetre (12 in) thick deck armour, until by chance, one put a bomb straight down the funnel, killing 54 of the 67 crew. During the attack, the monitors' anti-aircraft gunners claimed three dive bombers shot down. The remaining three monitors were scuttled by their crews later on 12 April as German and Hungarian forces had occupied their bases and the river systems upon which they operated. The crews then gathered on a tugboat and attempted to flee to the Black Sea. While the boat was passing under a bridge near Zemun, it was attacked by Axis aircraft. Several bombs struck the bridge, causing it to collapse on the tug, and killing all but three of the crew.

=== Aftermath ===
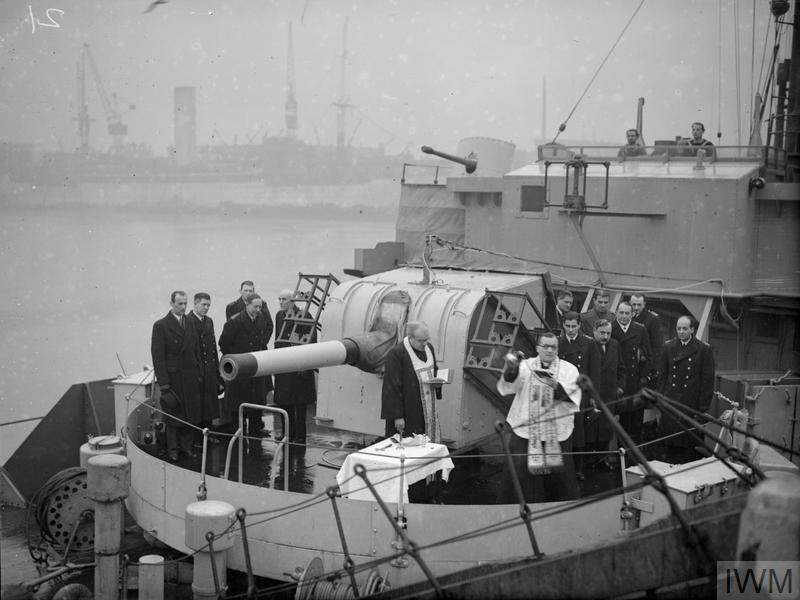
Renaming ceremony for the corvette Nada at Liverpool on 11 January 1944

The Italians captured most of the KM in port, including Ljubljana, which had spent the duration of the invasion in dry-dock. However, Zagreb was blown up and scuttled at the Bay of Kotor by two junior officers, Sergej Mašera and Milan Spasić, to prevent her capture. The submarine Nebojša and two Orjen-class MTBs escaped to Alexandria to join the Allied cause. A fourth destroyer, Split, was captured while under construction in the Kotor shipyard, but the Italians were not able to complete her before they sued for peace in September 1943. She was completed by the Yugoslav Navy after the war. Ten Maritime Air Force aircraft escaped to Greece, with nine eventually making it to Egypt, where they formed a squadron under Royal Air Force command. The three Yugoslav ships that escaped capture were used to create a KM-in-exile. The force was led by Captain Ivan Kern, who was attached to the Yugoslav government-in-exile in London, and operated with the British Mediterranean Fleet from bases in Malta and Alexandria.

A number of the captured Yugoslav warships, notably Dubrovnik, Beograd and the repaired Ljubljana, were employed by the Italian Regia Marina until the armistice in 1943, whereupon the German Kriegsmarine, and to a lesser extent the Navy of the Independent State of Croatia, appropriated the surviving vessels for their own fleets. Ljubljana was wrecked on a shoal near the Gulf of Tunis whilst in Italian service in April 1943, and Dalmacija entered German service with her previous German name Niobe, but was soon transferred to the Croatian navy as Zniam. Beached on Silba island, she was destroyed by British MTBs in December 1943. Dubrovnik and Beograd were not sunk by Allied forces until April and May 1945 respectively.

In early 1944, the Royal Navy Flower-class corvette Mallow was transferred to the KM-in-exile as Nada. In August 1945, following the end of World War II in Europe, the British government ordered the navy to disband. Its assets were transferred to the newly constituted post-war Yugoslav Navy, where they continued their service. The post-war Yugoslav Navy drew its insignia and traditions from the Partisan naval forces that evolved from armed fishing vessels operated along the Adriatic coast from late 1942, so few of the traditions of the KM were carried over to the post-war navy. The British government gave the personnel of the KM-in-exile the choice of being repatriated or remaining in exile. Of these, 93 men chose to stay abroad. The British government briefly housed them in military camps before allowing them to move to countries of their choosing.

== Organisation ==
=== Peacetime ===
The peacetime organisation of the KM remained essentially unchanged from 1929 until the invasion of Yugoslavia. The Naval Command in Zemun formed part of the Ministry of Army and Navy, and controlled Navy Headquarters. Navy Headquarters consisted of the staff, archives, main naval radio station and the navy newspaper, and controlled six branches; the fleet, River and Lake Forces, Maritime Air Force, Coastal Defence Command, Naval Surveillance Command, and shore establishments. The exact composition of the fleet varied considerably as vessels were added and disposed of, but from 1938 it usually comprised three torpedo divisions, a submarine division and a training squadron, reaching its maximum strength during the summer training period each year. The minelayers were usually part of the Coastal Defence Command, but were detached to the fleet during naval exercises, as were naval aviation squadrons. The Maritime Air Force consisted of three seaplane commands each of two groups, the naval aviation school and the seaplane depot ship Zmaj.

=== Wartime ===
In case of war or national emergency, the Naval Staff was to become directly subordinate to the Supreme Command. The Naval Staff would command the fleet, river flotilla, Maritime Air Force and Naval Coastal Command. All other naval establishments would remain under the control of the Navy Section of the Ministry of Army and Navy. There were a few exceptions to these general arrangements. For example, the naval detachments on Lake Ohrid and Lake Scutari were subordinated to the local army districts, and the Naval Coastal Command was subordinated to the Royal Yugoslav Army's Coastal Defence Command. In case of mobilisation, the navy would need to requisition about 250 sea-going and 25 river vessels.

== Logistics and personnel ==
Main bases of the KM

The primary base for the KM was in the Bay of Kotor on the southern Adriatic coast. It encompassed the Tivat Arsenal and several schools and other establishments. Other bases were located at Šibenik in central Dalmatia and Selce in the northern Adriatic. The Yugoslav coastline extended for 560 kilometres (350 mi), and there were over 600 Yugoslav islands in the Adriatic. The main riverine port was at Novi Sad on the Danube. Throughout its existence, the KM struggled with logistical difficulties associated with foreign-made ships and naval armament. The KM grew from slightly over 3,000 officers and men soon after its establishment to a strength of more than 9,000 immediately prior to World War II. Ship crews ranged from 240 for the flotilla leader Dubrovnik and 145 for the Beograd-class destroyers, to just five for the Uskok-class MTBs.

== See also ==
- List of ships of the Royal Yugoslav Navy
