= List of admirals of Croatia =

Birthplaces of 4- and 5-star (fleet) admirals in Croatia.

Admirals from Croatia served in many naval forces on the eastern Adriatic seaboard. First admirals (Jakov de Cessamis Šubić and his son Matej, Rafael de Sorba etc.), were mentioned in 1350s as commanders of the royal fleet of Croatian-Hungarian king Louis I. Officers from today's Croatia served in various navies in control of Croatia or its parts. For instance, Jusuf Mašković served as a grand admiral of Ottoman Navy in 1630s; Ivan of Vrana was a Venetian admiral in late 16th century, taking part in the Battle of Lepanto. Croatian personnel served in the Venetian Navy until its demise in 1797 and, in modern times, in Habsburg/Austro-Hungarian Navy as Croatia was a constituent part of the monarchy (until 1918). First Croatian admirals distinguished themselves commanding Habsburg ships in First Italian War of Independence in 1848.

Croatian admirals helped lead Austro-Hungarian Navy through World War I and later oversaw the creation and development of Royal Yugoslav Navy in the interwar years (1918–1941). In World War II they found themselves on opposing sides, as some chose to collaborate and joined rather limited Navy of Independent State of Croatia (1941–45), while others founded guerilla Partisan Navy, which liberated the Croatian Adriatic and later developed into Yugoslav Navy (1942–91). Croatian admirals co-led Yugoslav Navy during the Cold War, overseeing its development of submarines and frigates, strengthening its capacities. After 1991, breaking off from Yugoslav Navy, Croatian admirals steered Croatian Navy through the Croatian War of Independence from Yugoslavia (1991–5) and worked on joining NATO (2004).

What follows is a list of naval officers from the territory of today's Republic of Croatia. For a list of admirals of the modern, post-1991 Croatian Navy, see List of Croatian Navy admirals.

== Fleet Admiral ==
Rank Flag

1991–

1956-91?–

Fleet Admiral

In Yugoslav Navy, Branko Mamula was promoted to the rank of the Fleet Admiral in 1983. In Croatian Navy, rank of Fleet Admiral was introduced in 1995 as the naval equivalent to the five-star rank of the OF-10. Commending him on his role as the commander of Croatian Navy during the War of Independence (1991–5), president Tuđman conferred the rank on admiral Letica. Sveto Letica-Barba was the first and so far the only Croatian flag officer to hold this rank.

Name	Born	Died	Date of rank	Navy	Crew/Year	Notes
Sveto Letica	4 April 1926	6 November 2001	March 1996	Yugoslav Navy Croatian Navy	1950	Served in Yugoslav Navy 1942–86, retired as viceadmiral and retroactively promoted to the rank of admiral. Reactivated in 1991
Branko Mamula	30 May 1921	19 October 2021	22 December 1983	Yugoslav Navy	1958	

== Admirals ==
Rank Flags

1991-

1956–1991

1941–1945

1918–1941

1867–1918

Admiral

Name	Born	Died	Date of rank	Navy	Crew/Year	Notes
Mate Jerković	1905	1980	1956	Yugoslav Navy		People's Hero of Yugoslavia
Bogdan Pecotić	1912	1998	1968	Yugoslav Navy		People's Hero of Yugoslavia
Ljubo Truta	1915	1991	1969	Yugoslav Navy		People's Hero of Yugoslavia
Maximilian Njegovan	31 October 1858	1 July 1930	23 February 1917	Austro-Hungarian Navy	1877	Commander of Austro-Hungarian Navy 1917–8
Dragutin Prica	1867	1960	6 September 1929	Royal Yugoslav Navy	1885	Served as a rear admiral in Austro-Hungarian Navy until 1918
Viktor Wickerhauser	1866	1940	30 April 1930	Royal Yugoslav Navy	1885	Served as a rear admiral (1917) in Austro-Hungarian Navy until 1918
Božidar Grubišić	1932	2021	1988	Yugoslav Navy; Croatian Navy		Joined Croatian Navy in 1991, his earlier rank confirmed
Ivo Purišić	1920	1976	1974	Yugoslav Navy		
Petar Šimić	1932	1990	1989	Yugoslav Navy		
Davor Domazet-Lošo	1948		2000	Croatian Navy		retired in 2000
Vid Stipetić	1937	2011	2002	Croatian Navy	1959	retired in 2002
Robert Hranj	1962		11 March 2020	Croatian Navy	1985	retired in June 2024
Tihomir Vilović	1924	2008	5 July 1984	Yugoslav Navy		Retired as viceadmiral in April 1984; in July retroactively promoted to the rank of an admiral

== Vice Admirals ==
Rank Flags

1991-

1956–1991

1941–1945

1918–1941

1867–1918

Vice Admiral

Name	Born	Died	Date of rank	Navy	Crew/Year	Notes
Zdravko Kardum	1953	4 September 2023	2009	Croatian Navy		retired in 2011
Ante Urlić	1957		2013	Croatian Navy	1977	retired in 2014
Davorin Kajić	1957	2020	1995	Croatian Navy	1958	retired in 2002
Edgar Angeli	1892	1945	1943	Navy of the Independent State of Croatia		
Andrija Božanić	1906	1989	1961	Yugoslav Navy		People's Hero of Yugoslavia
Josip Grubelić	1918	2006	22 December 1971	Yugoslav Navy		served as an NCO in Royal Yugoslav Navy
Mladen Marušić	1923	2009	22 December 1976	Yugoslav Navy		
Benko Matulić	1914	1976	22 December 1968	Yugoslav Navy		
Milan Vraneš	1922		22 December 1975	Yugoslav Navy		
Josip Žužul	1923	1993	22 December 1974	Yugoslav Navy		
Ante Paić	1923	2009	22 December 1977	Yugoslav Navy		
Momčilo Novaković	1916	1988	22 December 1967	Yugoslav Navy		People's Hero of Yugoslavia
Nikola Aračić	1915	1978	22 December 1966	Yugoslav Navy		
Pero Bogunović	1924	2012	22 December 1978	Yugoslav Navy		
Veljko Dokmanović	1926	1982	22 December 1978	Yugoslav Navy	1/	
Nikola Steinfel	1889	1945	May 1944	Navy of the Independent State of Croatia	1909	retired as SotL Captain of Royal yugoslav Navy in Feb 1940
Marijan Polić	1876	1958	6 September 1935	Royal Yugoslav Navy	1893	Retired in April 1940
Dušan Rakić	1943	2020	1994	Yugoslav War Navy	117/1965	left Yugoslav navy (SFRY) in 1992 as captain (kbb)

== Rear Admirals ==
Rank Flags

1991-

1956–1991

1941–1945

1918–1941

1867–1918

Rear Admiral

Name	Born	Died	Date of rank	Navy	Crew/Year	Notes
Ivo Raffanelli	1965		18 September 2019	Croatian Navy	1987	retired as of March 2025
Predrag Stipanović	1964		2016	Croatian Navy	1986	
Damir Dojkić	1966		28 May 2025	Croatian Navy	1988	Commander of Croatian Navy 2024-
Tihomir Erceg	1959	2019	2015	Croatian Navy	1982	retired in 2015
Julijan Luterotti	1884	1956	1 December 1937	Royal Yugoslav Navy; Navy of the Independent State of Croatia	1902	In 1941 commander-in-chief of Royal Yugoslav Navy Later joined ISC Navy, earlier rank confirmed
Janko Vuković	7 October 1871	1 November 1918	30 October 1918	State of Slovenes, Croats and Serbs Navy	1889	Served in Austro-Hungarian Navy as captain. Promoted to the rank of rear admiral by the State of Slovenes, Croats and Serbs
Đuro Jakčin	1889	1944	10 April 1941	Navy of the Independent State of Croatia	1909	
Stanko Parmać	1913	1982	22 December 1954	Yugoslav Navy		People's Hero of Yugoslavia
Dinko Šurkalo	1920	2010	1969	Yugoslav Navy		People's Hero of Yugoslavia
Marko Eugen Florio	1820	1906	1889	Austro-Hungarian Navy		
Vid von Vončina	1867	1935	11 May 1918	Austro-Hungarian Navy	1885	
Ivan Buratović	1785	1849	28 August 1848	Austria Navy	von Flaggentreu	
Juraj Bonači	1903	1971	1958	Yugoslav Navy	1929	
Ante Kronja	1915	1985	22 December 1961	Yugoslav Navy		
Alojz Vjekoslav Bačić	1864	1950	29 December 1919	Austro-Hungarian Navy	1882	
Artur Catinelli Obradić-Bevilacqua	1867	1939	1 May 1918	Austro-Hungarian Navy	1886	
Paul Stupar	1866	1928	1 May 1918	Austro-Hungarian Navy	1886	
Mario August Petar Ratković von Modruš	1870	1918	1 November 1918	Austro-Hungarian Navy	1888	
Josip Erceg	1936	2022	22 December 1986	Yugoslav Navy; Croatian Navy	1957	Joined Croatian Navy, his earlier rank confirmed
Martin Matošević	1933	2023	22 December 1987	Yugoslav Navy		
Fridrih Moretti	1932	2024	22 December 1990	Yugoslav Navy	5/	
Đuro Pojer	1935	2008	22 December 1987	Yugoslav Navy	9/	
Ante Budimir (admiral)	1945		1993	Croatian Navy		retired in 2002
Vladimir Marijašević	1886	1961	1 December 1937	Royal Yugoslav Navy; Navy of the Independent State of Croatia		Retired in 1940; later joined ISC Navy, earlier rank confirmed
Tomo Tijanić	1887	1953	1 December 1939	Royal Yugoslav Navy; Navy of the Independent State of Croatia		Joined ISC Navy, earlier rank confirmed
Milan Domainko	1889	1968	6 September 1940	Royal Yugoslav Navy	1909	Commander in chief of Royal Yugoslav Navy in April 1941
Branimir Radelić	1916	1998	1970	Yugoslav Navy		
Silvius Enea Luigi Francesco Sigismondo Bersa Edler von Leidenthal	1854	1913	3 January 1910	Austro-Hungarian Navy		born in Šibenik
Emanuel Haračić	1858	1922	10 August 1917	Austro-Hungarian Navy		retired in 1907, reactivated, promoted to Titular RAdm, retired in April 1918
Petar Grancich von Cetinathal	1836	1917	1 May 1892	Austro-Hungarian Navy		promoted to RAdm at his retirement

== Sources ==
=== Yugoslav Navy ===
- SotL Captain Pecotić, Kuzma (1947–2012). List of Yugoslav Navy admirals
- Petar Strčić. On Admiral Petar Simic
- List of admirals with active duty period and year a rank was attained

=== Royal Yugoslav Navy ===
- Bjelajac, Mile (2004). Generali i admirali Kraljevine Jugoslavije 1918—1941. Beograd: Institut za noviju istoriju Srbije. ISBN 978-86-7005-039-6.
- List of Royal Yugoslav admirals and generals (in Serbian)
- List of Royal Yugoslav naval officers who served in collaborationist Croatian Navy

=== Austro-Hungarian Navy ===
- Schmidt-Brentano, Antonio. Die k. k. bzw. k. u. k. Generalität 1816-1918. Oesterreichischer Staatsarchiv, 2007
- Dubrović, Ervin. Vojno-pomorska akademija u Rijeci 1866.-1914. Rijeka: Pomorski fakultet u Rijeci/Muzej Grada Rijeke, 2011.
- "Rang- und Einteilungsliste Marine 1876-1918 | Könyvtár | Hungaricana". library.hungaricana.hu.
