= Commander of the Croatian Navy =

Head of the navy of Croatia

- Zapovjednik Hrvatske ratne mornarice
- Incumbent; Rear Admiral Ivo Raffanelli since 18 December 2017
- Croatian Navy
- Reports to: Chief of the General Staff
- Term length: No fixed length
- Precursor: Commander of the Yugoslav Navy
- Formation: 12 September 1991
- First holder: Sveto Letica
- Deputy: Deputy Commander, Chief of Naval Staff

The Commander of the Croatian Navy is the official head of the Croatian Navy. Commodore Damir Dojkić is the current commander and was appointed in 2024.

== List of commanders ==
No.	Portrait	Name	Took office	Left office	Time in office	Ref.
1	Sveto Letica	Admiral flote Sveto Letica (1926–2001)	12 September 1991	1 June 1996	4 years, 263 days	
2	Vid Stipetić [hr]	Admiral; Vid Stipetić (1937–2011)	1 June 1996	31 December 2002	6 years, 213 days	
3	Zdravko Kardum [hr]	Viceadmiral; Zdravko Kardum (born 1953)	31 December 2002	19 March 2007	4 years, 78 days	
4	Ante Urlić [hr]	Viceadmiral; Ante Urlić (born 1956)	19 March 2007	1 November 2012	5 years, 227 days	
5	Robert Hranj	Admiral; Robert Hranj (born 1962)	1 November 2012	30 January 2015	2 years, 90 days	
6	Predrag Stipanović	Kontraadmiral; Predrag Stipanović (born 1964)	30 January 2015	18 December 2017	2 years, 320 days	
7	Ivo Raffanelli	Kontraadmiral; Ivo Raffanelli (born 1965)	1 January 2018	12 January 2024	6 years, 11 days	
7	Damir Dojkić	Komodor; Damir Dojkić (born 1966)	12 January 2024	Incumbent	2 years, 238 days	
