= Silba-class landing ship-minelayer =

Class of landing ships

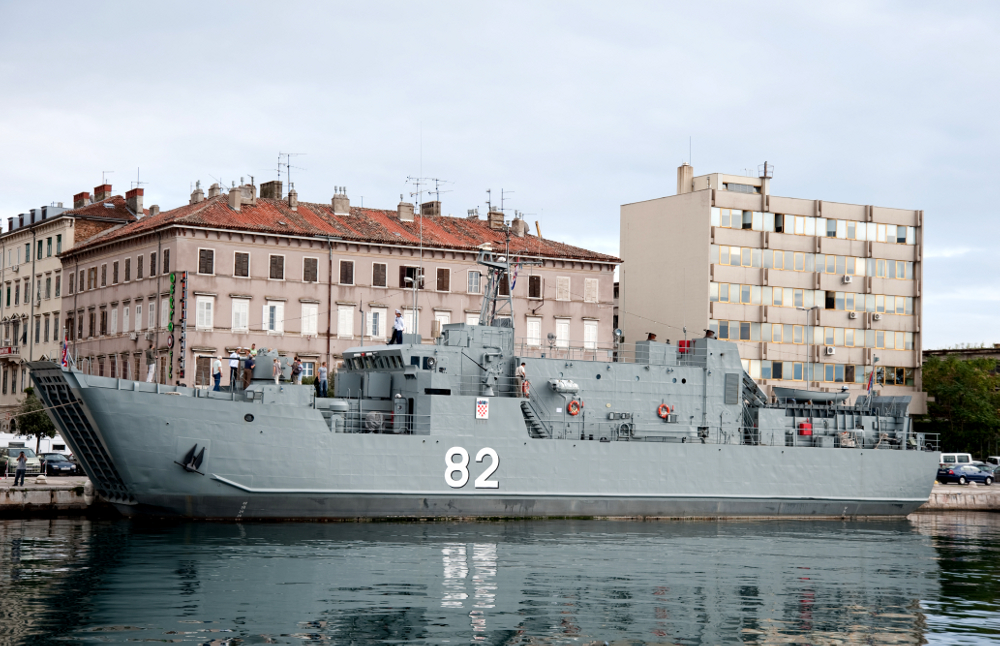
- Krka (DBM-82) photographed in Rijeka on 17 September 2009 during the Croatian Navy day.

Class overview
- Builders: Brodogradilište specijalnih objekata (BSO), Split
- Built: 1980s–1994
- Completed: 3
- Active: 2

General characteristics
- Length: 49.69 m (163 ft 0 in)
- Beam: 10.2 m (33 ft 6 in)
- Draft: 2.6 m (8 ft 6 in)
- Propulsion: Two shafts; 2 × Burmeister & Wain Alpha diesel engines; 1,140 kW (1,530 hp) each
- Speed: Maximum: 12.5 knots (23.2 km/h; 14.4 mph)
- Range: 1,200–1,400 nmi (2,200–2,600 km; 1,400–1,600 mi) at 12 knots (22 km/h; 14 mph)
- Endurance: 12 days
- Complement: 32
- Armament: 2 × AK-230; 1 × 20 mm (0.79 in) M-75 gun; 1 × MTU-4 9K32M Strela-2M anti-aircraft missile; or; 2 × 20 mm M-71; 1 × Bofors 40 mm (1.6 in) gun; 1 × MTU-4 9K32M Strela-2M

The Silba class (sometimes the Cetina class) is a class of three landing ships, also used as minelayers, built for the Yugoslav (JRM) and Croatian Navy (HRM) during the 1980s and 1990s. The ships were built at the Brodogradilište specijalnih objekata shipyard in Split with slight differences in armament configuration between the last two ships. By the time the Croatian War of Independence started, one ship was in service with the JRM while another was being completed.

The one in JRM service was relocated to Montenegro where it would be commissioned with the Navy of the new FR Yugoslavia. The second ship that was captured unfinished was completed by Croatian forces and entered service with the HRM, followed by a third that was laid down by Croatia in 1993. The two ships commissioned with the HRM remain in active service, providing assistance to civilian institutions aside from their regular military tasks. The first ship in the class is currently decommissioned and in reserve in the Bay of Kotor, Montenegro.

== Development and building ==
The Silba class was developed by the Brodarski institut (BI) from Zagreb as a replacement for a large number of aging barge-like landing craft based on German World War II designs (Marinefährprahm and Siebel). All three ships were completed at the Brodogradilište specijalnih objekata (BSO) in Split, Croatia. The first one, Krk (DBM-241), was commissioned with the JRM sometime between 1986 and 1990. The keel for the second ship that was to be named Rab (DBM-242) was laid down in 1990. As the Croatian War of Independence started, unfinished Rab was captured by Croatian forces. It was completed and launched as Cetina (DBM-81) on 18 July 1992. A third and final ship was launched on 17 September 1994 as Krka (DBM-82).

== Description ==
These ferry-like ships feature a roll-on/roll-off design with two loading ramps located on the bow and the stern. Measuring 49.69 m (163 ft 0 in) in length, they have a 10.2 m (33 ft 6 in) beam with a 2.6 m (8 ft 6 in) draft. Propulsion consists of two 1,140 kW (1,530 hp) Burmeister & Wain Alpha Diesel 10V 23L VO engines mounted on two shafts, enabling them a maximum speed of 12.5 knots (23.2 km/h; 14.4 mph) and a cruising speed of 12 knots (22 km/h; 14 mph). Traveling at their cruise speed they have a range of 1,200–1,400 nautical miles (2,200–2,600 km; 1,400–1,600 mi) with a 12-day endurance. The ships are crewed by a complement of 32.

The armament configuration differs between the first two ships and the last one; DBM-241 and DBM-81 are armed with two AK-230 CIWS mounted on the sides, a single quadruple 20 mm (0.79 in) M-75 gun on the stern and a single quadruple MTU-4 9K32M Strela-2M (SA-7b "Grail") anti-aircraft missile launcher. The interior, which features two mine rails, can be used to carry up to 152 different naval mines, six medium tanks or 300 troops with equipment, a total cargo capacity of 460 t (450 long tons). DBM-82 was completed with a different gun armament; in place of the AK-230, DBM-82 has two 20 mm M-71 guns on the sides and a single Bofors D70 40 mm (1.6 in) gun on the bow. The ship was also completed as an auxiliary water carrier with a capacity of around 230 t (230 long tons) of fresh water. The number of mines that DBM-82 can carry is a maximum of 114.

== Ships ==
Name	Pennant number	Namesake	Builder	Laid down	Launched	Commissioned	Fate
Krk	DBM-241	Krk	Brodogradilište specijalnih objekata, Split, Croatia	—	—	—	decommissioned; In Montenegro
Cetina (Rab)	DBM-81 (DBM-242)	Cetina (Rab)	Brodogradilište specijalnih objekata, Split, Croatia	1990	18 July 1992	19 February 1993	In service with the Croatian Navy
Krka	DBM-82	Krka	Brodogradilište specijalnih objekata, Split, Croatia	19 February 1993	17 September 1994	9 March 1995	In service with the Croatian Navy

== Service history ==
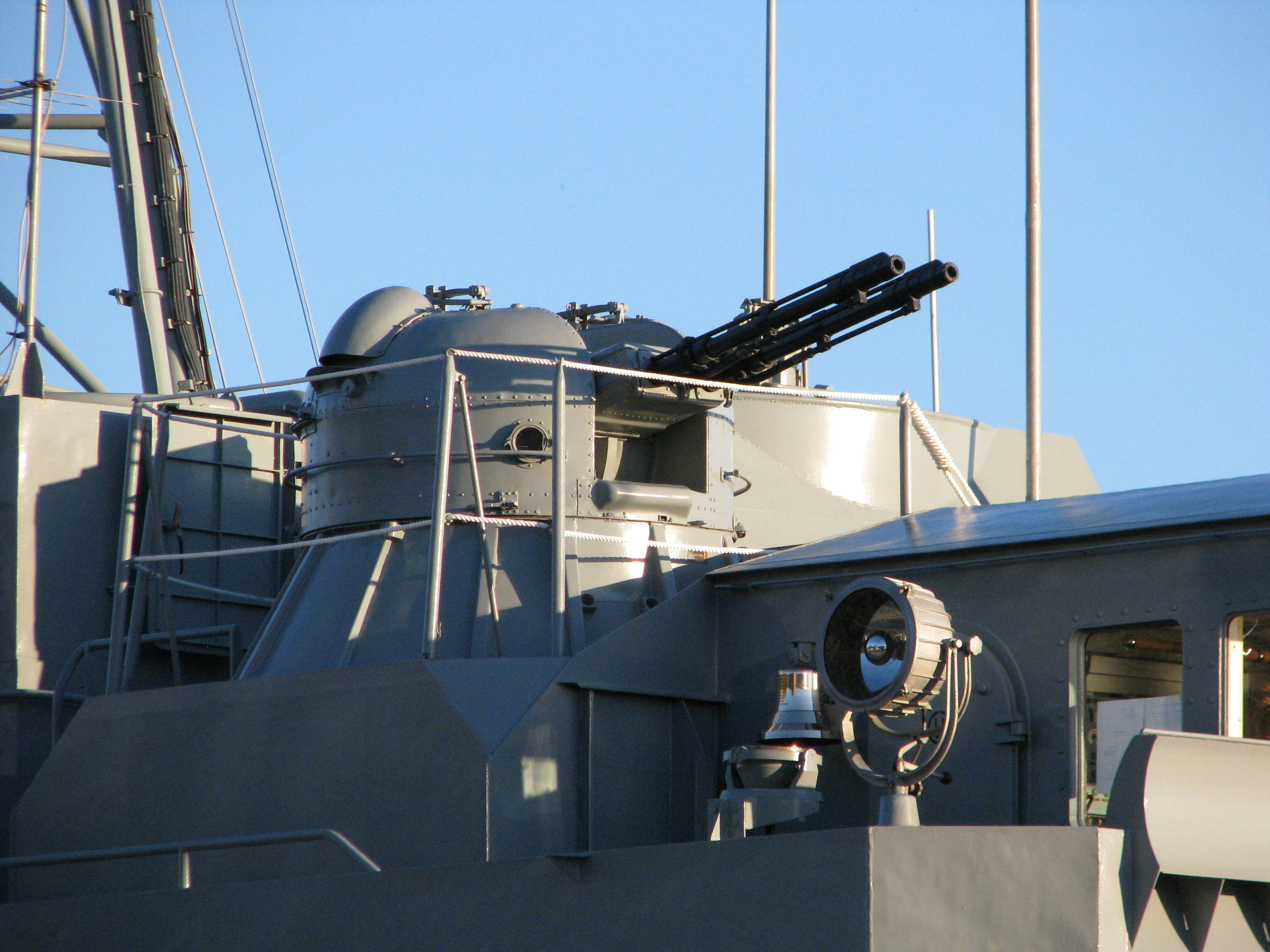
AK-230 on Cetina photographed in 2010

At the start of the Croatian War of Independence DBM-241 was relocated to Montenegro where it later entered service with the SR Yugoslav Navy. DBM-242, now redesignated as DBM-81 was launched as Cetina and entered service with the Croatian Navy 19 February 1992 with Ivo Raffanelli in command. For the remainder of the war, Cetina was engaged in transporting troops and equipment along the coast, including supply runs for Croatian forces during Operation Maslenica in 1993. The same year the ship participated in testing of the new MNS-M90 naval mine. DBM-82, the third and final ship of the class, was commissioned with the Croatian Navy on 9 March 1995 with Jerko Bošnjak in command.

According to publications and news reports, DBM-241 was reported operational as late as 2005. An article published in October 2012 reported that the Egyptian Navy bought DBM-241 a year earlier. Although the advance was paid, the official handover of the ship has not happened by the time the article was published. As of March 2014, the official website of the Armed Forces of Montenegro does not list DBM-241 among its fleet: the ship is currently in reserve in the Bay of Kotor, opposite Đenovići. The two Silba-class vessels in Croatian hands continue to see service the Navy Flotilla performing traditional naval tasks as well as support missions for civilian institutions such water supply and transporting firefighters.

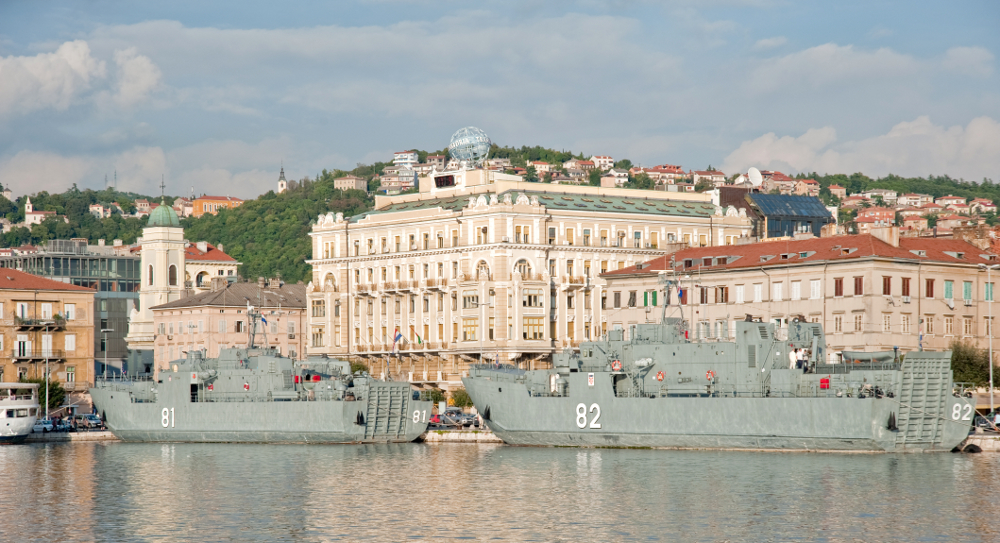
Cetina and Krka in Rijeka, 2009

In July 2006 Krka was damaged during an overhaul at the Šibenik Shipyard. While being lowered to the sea, the winch of the syncrolift pulled out of the concrete causing the ship to fall down, creating a hole in the hull and sinking the stern. Early reports of significant damage proved to be false and the ship was repaired soon after. Out of ten crew members that were on board at the time, only one sustained minor injuries.

In 2015, Krka and Cetina were tasked with transporting Croatian Army vehicles and personnel to Spain for the NATO "Trident Juncture" exercise. The ships departed the Lora Naval Base on 11 October 2015, loaded with four Patria AMVs, two trucks, one motor vehicle and 14 soldiers scheduled to take part in the exercise. On 13 October they arrived in Catania where they rendezvoused with Andrija Mohorovičić deployed in support of Operation Triton. The two ships made another stop at Cagliari before continuing to Spain, arriving in Sagunto on 18 October after spending seven days at sea. The ships returned to the Lora Naval Base on 13 November, concluding their month long deployment during which they traversed a total of 2,700 nautical miles (5,000 kilometres; 3,100 miles).

== See also ==
- List of active Croatian Navy ships
- List of ships of the Yugoslav Navy

Equivalent landing ships of the same era

- Lublin class
