= Helsinki-class missile boat =

Finnish and Croatian naval class

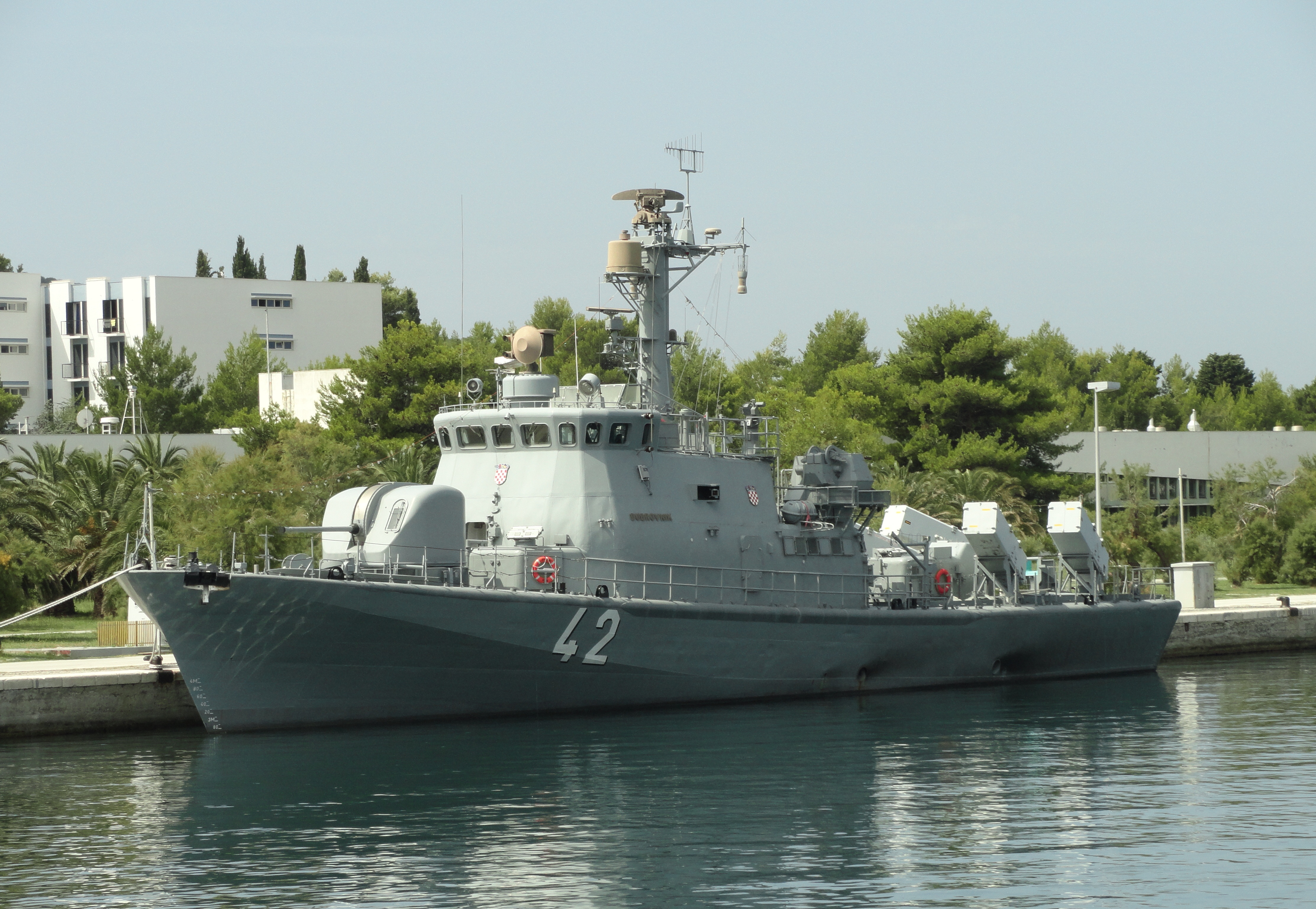
- Dubrovnik (RTOP-42) in the Lora naval base, August 2011

Class overview
- Name: Helsinki
- Builders: Wärtsilä Helsinki Shipyard
- Operators: Finnish Navy; Croatian Navy
- Preceded by: Tuima-class missile boat
- Succeeded by: Rauma-class missile boat
- In service: 1981–2007 (Finland); 2008– (Croatia)
- Completed: 4
- Active: 2
- Scrapped: 2

General characteristics
- Type: Fast attack craft
- Displacement: 300 tons
- Length: 45 m (148 ft)
- Beam: 8.9 m (29 ft)
- Draught: 3 m (10 ft)
- Installed power: 3 × MTU 16V 538 TB92; 9,000 kW (combined)
- Propulsion: Three shafts
- Speed: 32 knots (59 km/h; 37 mph)
- Complement: 30
- Sensors & processing systems: Philips 9LV 225 fire control radar; Saab EOS400 optical director; 9GA 208 Surface search radar; Raytheon ARPA Navigation radar; Simrad SS304 hull mounted sonar; Finnyards Sonac/PTA towed array sonar
- Electronic warfare & decoys: Philax chaff and IR flairs; ESM: Argo Systems radar warning system; 6 × 103 mm rails for rocket illuminants
- Armament: 1 × Bofors 57 mm/70 Mk1; 2 × Sako twin-barreled 23 mm/87 (modified ZU-23-2); 8 × Saab RBS-15 SSM; 2 × rails for depth charges

Helsinki-class missile boat (Finnish: Helsinki-luokan ohjusvene) is a class of four fast attack craft built for the Finnish Navy. All the ships were constructed at the Wärtsilä Helsinki Shipyard, Finland, and had Pansio as their homeport.

== Service ==
The vessels were designed as fast attack crafts, but designated "missile boats" in the Finnish Navy, as to tone down their offensive capabilities. They were armed with up to eight RBS-15 SSMs, one dual-purpose Bofors 57 mm gun, two SAKO 23 mm double-barreled anti-aircraft guns and two depth charge racks.

During the late 1990s, the class was due to undergo a mid-life upgrade through 2006–2008 but this was rejected because of budget constraints. The ships were decommissioned from Finnish service, and Helsinki and Turku were used for testing purposes before they were scrapped in 2011.

Two of the vessels were sold to the Croatian Navy for a price of €9 million (65 million kuna) as a part of an off-set deal for the previous Croatian purchase of 126 Patria AMV vehicles.

The ships arrived in Croatia on 2 November 2008. They underwent a basic refit and repainting, and entered service in January 2009. According to current plans the ships are scheduled to stay active until 2020–2022.

== Ships ==
Name (original)	Pennant number (original)	Commissioned	Status
Helsinki	60	1 September 1981.	Decommissioned in 2002; scrapped.
Turku	61	3 June 1985.	Decommissioned in 2002; scrapped.
Oulu	62	1 October 1985.	Decommissioned in 2008 and sold to Croatia as RTOP-41 Vukovar.
Kotka	63	16 June 1986.	Decommissioned in 2008 and sold to Croatia as RTOP-42 Dubrovnik.
