= Rafanelli =

Rafanelli (pronounced [rafaˈnɛlli]) or Raffanelli (pronounced [raffaˈnɛlli]) is an Italian surname. It comes from the medieval name Rafano. Notable people with the surname include:

- Angela Rafanelli (born 1978), Italian TV host
- Ivo Raffanelli or Rafanelli (born 1965), Croatian naval officer
- Leda Rafanelli (1880–1971), Italian author
- Sarah Rafanelli (born 1972), American association football player
- Rinaldo Rafanelli (1949–2021), Argentine bassist
