= Croatian training ship Andrija Mohorovičić =

Vessel of the Croatian navy

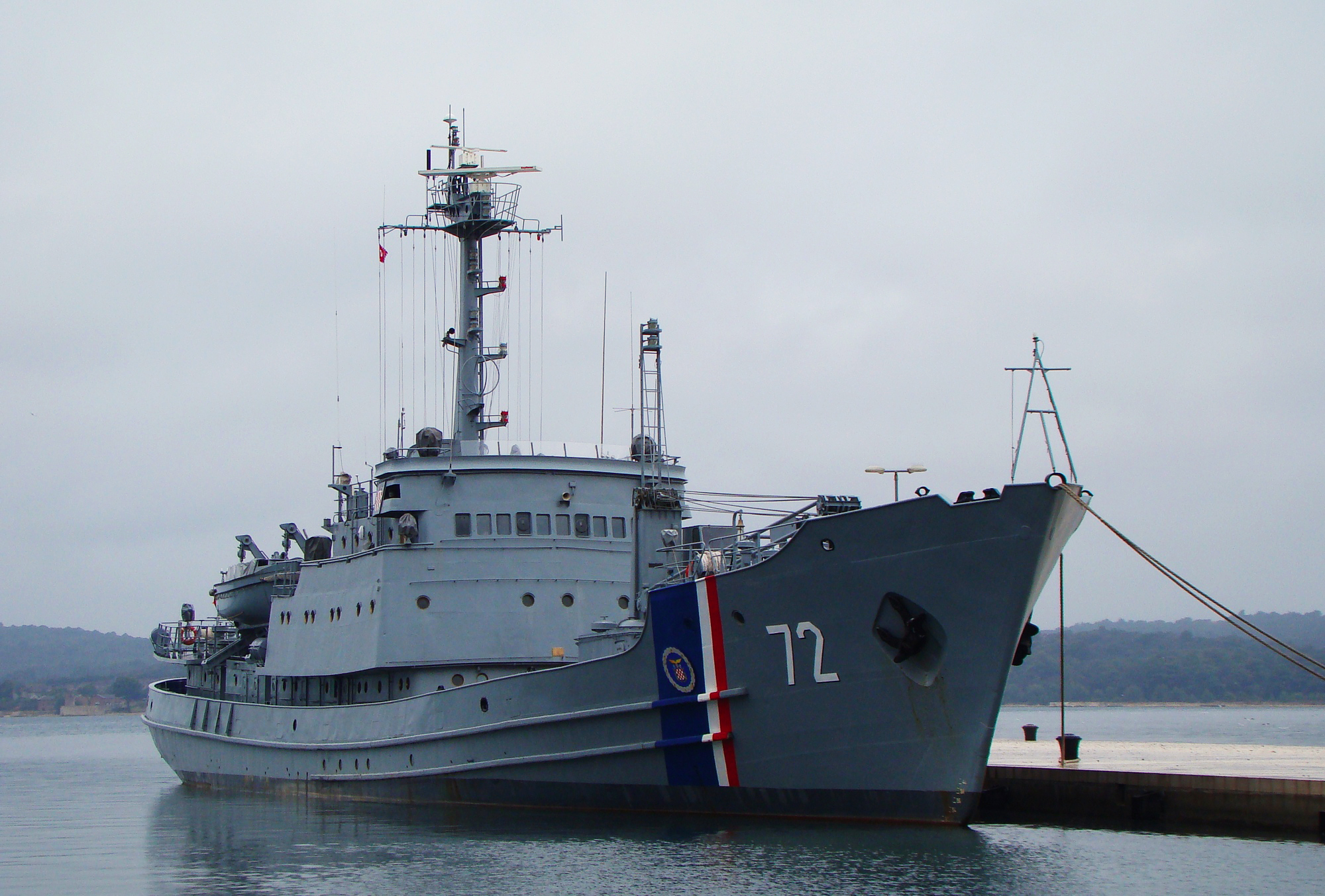
- Andrija Mohorovičić photographed in 2009

History

Yugoslavia
- Name: Andrija Mohorovičić
- Namesake: Andrija Mohorovičić
- Builder: Gdańsk Shipyard, Gdańsk, Polish People's Republic
- Completed: 1971
- Commissioned: 10 September 1972
- Identification: Pennant number: PH-33
- Fate: Captured by Croatian forces in 1991

Croatia
- Name: Andrija Mohorovičić
- Acquired: 1991
- Commissioned: January 1994
- Homeport: Lora Naval Base, Split
- Identification: Pennant number: BŠ-72; MMSI number: 238319840; Callsign: 9AA3731
- Status: Active

General characteristics
- Displacement: Full: 1,514 t (1,490 long tons)
- Length: 73.3 m (240 ft 6 in)
- Beam: 11.2 m (36 ft 9 in)
- Draft: 3.9 m (12 ft 10 in)
- Propulsion: Two shafts; 2 × Zgoda-Sulzer diesel engines; total of 3,300 hp (2,500 kW)
- Speed: 17 knots (31 km/h; 20 mph)
- Range: 9,000 nmi (17,000 km; 10,000 mi) at 11 kn (20 km/h; 13 mph)
- Crew: 27
- Armament: 2 × 20 mm (0.79 in) gun

Andrija Mohorovičić (pennant number BŠ-72) is a Moma-class hydrographic survey ship used as a training vessel by the Croatian Navy (Croatian: Hrvatska ratna mornarica – HRM). The ship was built by the Gdańsk Shipyard in 1971 for use by the Hydrographic Institute of the Yugoslav Navy. At the start of the Croatian War of Independence, the ship was captured by Croatian forces and commissioned in the HRM in 1993.

Since then, the ship has been used as a training ship and a patrol boat of the Croatian Coast Guard. In 2015 Andrija Mohorovovičić deployed to southern Italy to participate in Operation Triton, rescuing immigrants attempting to cross the Mediterranean Sea into the European Union. The ship returned to Croatia after three months, rescuing over 2,500 immigrants during the course of its deployment

== Design and building ==
Andrija Mohorovičić was built in 1971 at the Gdańsk Shipyard in what was then the Polish People's Republic. It measures 73.3 m (240 ft 6 in) in length, has a draught of 3.2 m (10 ft 6 in), a 11.2 m (36 ft 9 in) beam and a full displacement of 1,514 tonnes (1,490 long tons). Propulsion consists of two Zgoda-Sulzer 6TD48 diesel engines rated at 3,300 horsepower (2,500 kW) and mounted on two shafts, giving the ship a speed of 17 knots (31 km/h; 20 mph). Traveling at a speed of 11 knots (20 km/h; 13 mph) the ship has a range of 9,000 nautical miles (17,000 km; 10,000 mi). The crew numbers 27 members, four of which are officers. Its sole armament consists of two single-barreled 20 mm (0.79 in) guns. The ship is also equipped with a crane and a launch.

== Service history ==
Andrija Mohorovičić was commissioned in the Yugoslav Navy on 10 September 1972, and was assigned to the Navy's Hydrographic Institute under the command of Đuro Pojer. From October 1990, Andrija Mohorovičić was in Šibenik undergoing an overhaul and conversion to a training ship intended as a replacement for Galeb. The outbreak of the Croatian War of Independence, however, led to the ship being captured by Croatian forces in September 1991. Work on the conversion was completed by late 1993 and the ship was commissioned in the Croatian Navy in January 1994 with Renato Žarković as its first commander in Croatian service.

== See also ==
- List of active Croatian Navy ships
- List of ships of the Yugoslav Navy
