= Croatian Navy =

Naval force of the Croatian Armed Forces

- Hrvatska ratna mornarica
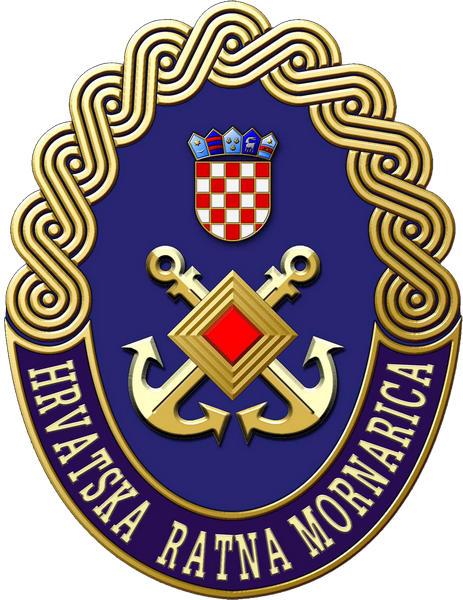
- Emblem of the Croatian Navy
- Founded: 12 September 1991; 35 years ago
- Country: Croatia
- Type: Navy
- Size: 1,363 (2026); 30 vessels (2026)
- Part of: Armed Forces of Croatia
- H/Q: Lora, Split, Croatia
- Patron: Saint Nicholas
- March: Mi smo hrvatski mornari (English: We are Croatian sailors!)
- Anniversaries: 18 September (Note: First recorded Croatian naval victory (under duke Branimir against Venetians near Makarska in AD 887).)
- Engagements: List: Croatian War of Independence: Battle of the Dalmatian Channels NATO missions: Operation Sea Guardian EU missions: Operation Atalanta; Operation Triton
- Website: https://www.morh.hr/en/

Commanders
- Commander: Commodore Ivo Raffanelli
- Deputy Commander, Chief of Naval Staff: Ship-of-the-line cpt. Milan Blažević
- Notable commanders: Fleet Admiral Sveto Letica, Admiral Vid Stipetić, Viceadmiral Zdravko Kardum, Rear Admiral Janko Vuković

Insignia
- Ensign

- Jack

The Croatian Navy (Croatian: Hrvatska ratna mornarica, HRM; lit. 'Croat War Navy') is the naval force branch of the Armed Forces of Croatia. It was formed in 1991, following the independence of Croatia, to secure its territorial waters and 1,778-kilometer coastline on the Adriatic Sea. The Navy is headquartered on the Lora Naval Base in Split, Croatia. It is the second-youngest service branch and second-largest above the Croatian Air Force and below the Croatian Army.

The Navy operates around 30 vessels, some of which alongside the Croatian Coast Guard. Its main offensive capabilities center on its coastal missile launcher network (RBS 15), six armed patrol boats, and five missile cutter warships. Since the 2020s, the Navy has seen resurgent defence spending in order to enable blue-water power and aid in international power projection. This includes the acquisition of two corvette warships as the Navy's next generation capital ships. The modern Navy has engaged in multiple military interventions including the anti-piracy Operation Atalanta as well as maritime security missions Operation Triton and Operation Sea Guardian.

== History ==
=== Origins ===
Since the ninth century, the Duchy of Croatia (later Kingdom) engaged in naval battles, struggling to maintain control over the eastern Adriatic coast and Adriatic merchant routes. Commemorating the first recorded Croat naval victory, when the subjects of Croatian duke Branimir defeated the Venetian naval expedition on 18 September, 887, the Croatian Navy Day is celebrated yearly on September 18. Croatian fleet was particularly active under duke Domagoj and king Petar Krešimir IV. Royal Croatian-Dalmatian navy with 12-15 galleys existed under Louis I in central Dalmatia in the 14th century. Afterwards Venetian Republic established control over most of Croatian coast until 1797. Modern foundations of Croatian Navy can be traced back to Austro-Hungarian Navy (1797–1918) and Yugoslav Navy (1918–1941, 1942–1991) when Croatia was a constituent part of these states.

When Croatia was a part of Austria-Hungary, its Adriatic coast was essentially the only access to sea this Central European state had. A Habsburg arsenal and a naval shipyard were established in Kraljevica in 1729, while naval bases, schools, shipyards, headquarters and a naval academy were later set up in Pula and Rijeka. Navy's emblem included Croatian coat of arms. Many highly ranked officers came from Croatia: grand admiral Maximilian Njegovan, ship-of-the-line captain Janko Vuković Podkapelski and others. In 1885, 44.9% of sailors and NCOs and 10.3% of naval officers came from Croatia,^{[Note]} while in 1910 those shares dropped to 29.8% and 9.8%, respectively. Czech military historian Jindřich Marek points out that "Croats were more often applied to heavy labour as stokers and deck hands" and were at comparative disadvantage due to their lack of swimming and German language skills. At the end of October 1918, while Austria-Hungary was falling apart and the war was drawing to an end, emperor Charles handed the Navy over to the Zagreb People's Council, which promoted Vuković to the rank of the rear admiral and appointed him as a fleet commander. Croatian flag was hoisted on all ships in Pula (including, most notably, the flagship SMS Viribus Unitis), but the Entente navies soon captured nearly all vessels and divided them among themselves.

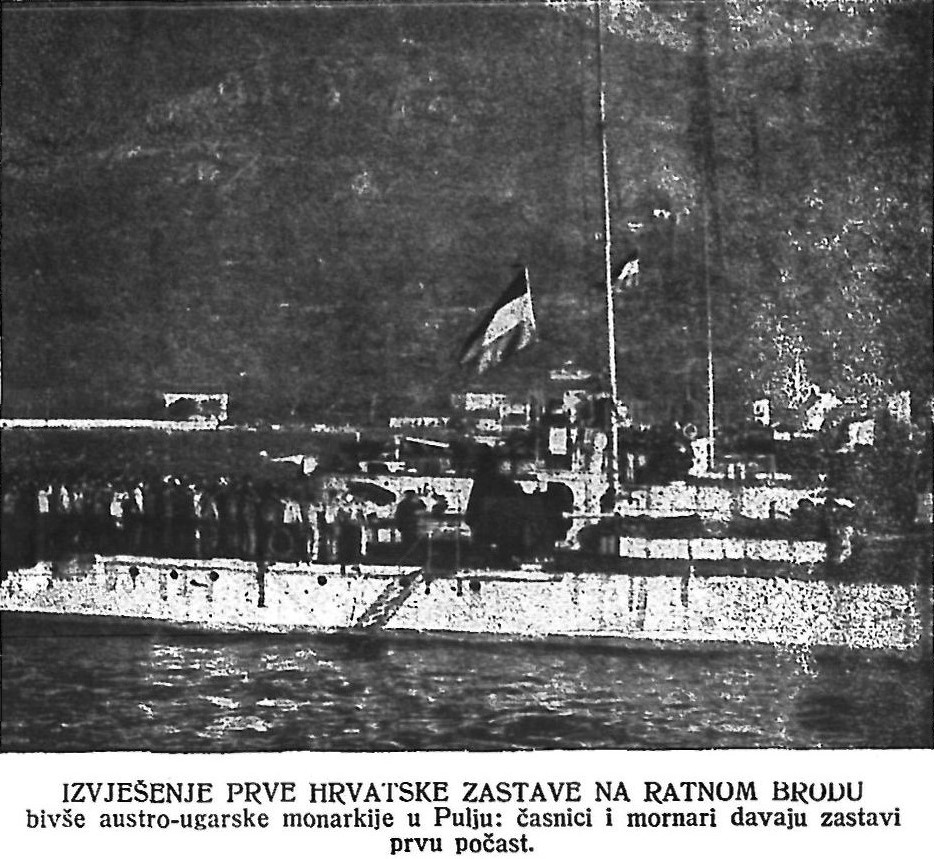
First Croatian flag ever hoisted on a naval ship, Pula, October 31st, 1918, with the crews saluting the flag

Croatian officers and sailors continued to man the new Royal Yugoslav Navy (1918–1941) until its demise during the Axis invasion of Yugoslavia. During World War II Croatian partisans formed a guerilla Partisan Navy consisting of makeshift vessels in 1942, resisting Italian (and later German) occupation of the Adriatic. In the later phases of the war, they cooperated closely with the Royal Navy. After the war, Socialist Yugoslav Navy, sprung up from the partisan navy, had Split as its HQ and mainly used shipyards in Šibenik, Split, Kraljevica, Rijeka and Pula.

In 1991, after the federal Yugoslav armed forces sided with Serbian leadership under Milošević and decided to fight against the democratically elected Croatian government which proclaimed Croatia's independence, ethnically Croat naval officers and rank-and-file led by admiral Sveto Letica started forming a new Croatian Navy. Using coastal artillery batteries they forced Yugoslav ships to retreat from Croatian territorial waters while in commando actions Croatian forces and shipyard personnel seized naval equipment and 35 vessels. At least three Yugoslav patrol boats were disabled in action and two minesweepers sunk. The Croatian Navy played an important role during the Croatian War of Independence (1991–1995), especially after acquiring strategically important RBS-15B missiles.

=== 21st century ===
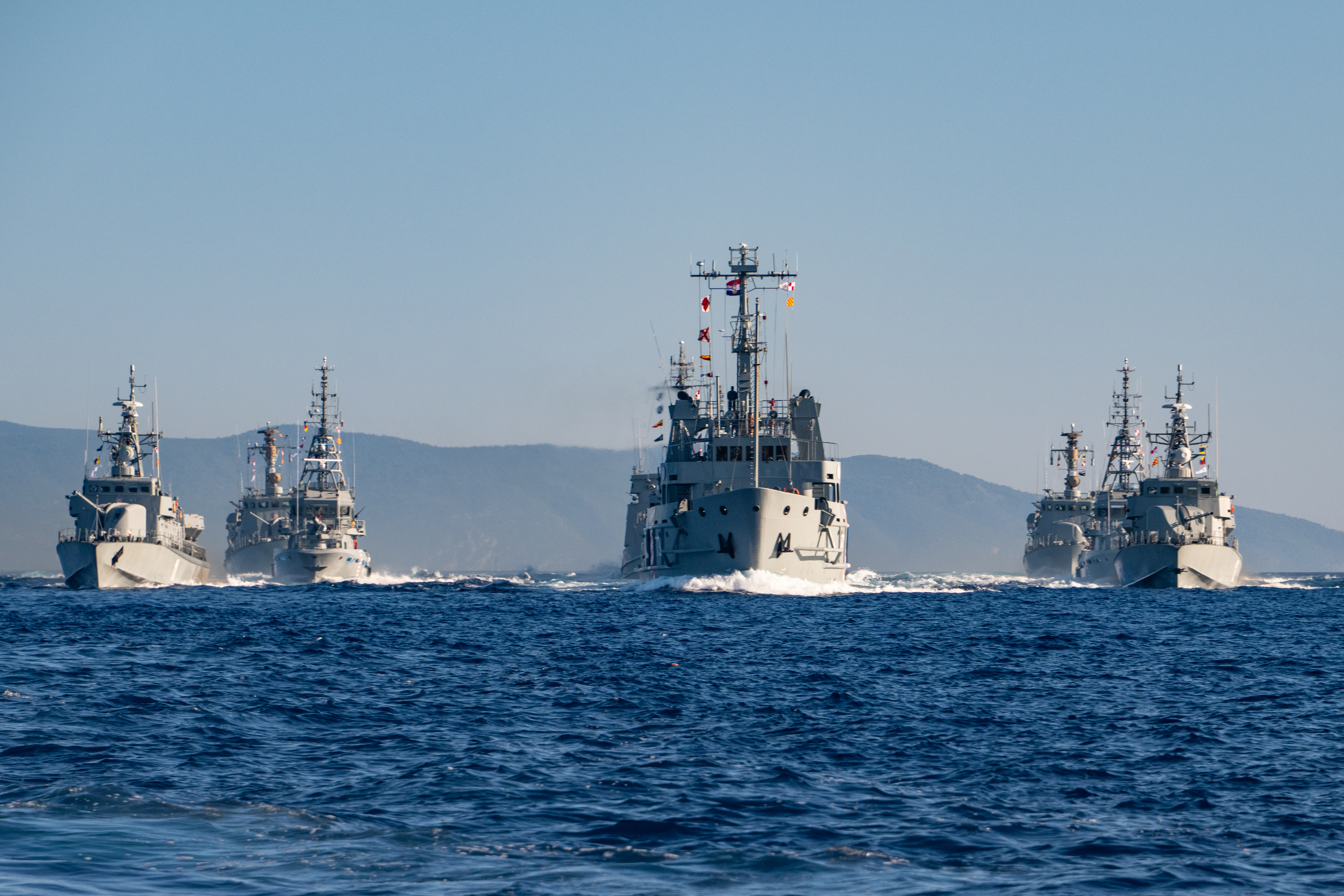
The Croatian Navy in 2025

Following Croatia's ascension into military alliance NATO in 2009, the Navy underwent multiple modernisation programs. During this time, two former Helsinki-class missile boats, FNS Oulu and FNS Kotka, were acquired from Finland for €9 million. They were renamed Vukovar and Dubrovnik, respectively, in December 2008. The Končar-class missile boat Šibenik was overhauled with new turbine engines and radars and in service until 2020. The Kralj-class vessels were planned to be extensively modernized at a price of €20 million, but as a result of the recent acquisition of Helsinki-class boats RTOP-11 completed a basic overhaul and engine upgrade worth around €5 million. The RBS-15 missile system was upgraded to include 20 units by 2018. Successful live firing of the upgraded missiles was conducted from a mobile launcher and from RTOP-12 in 2015 and again from RTOP-42 a year later.

Since the mid-2020s, the Croatian government pledged large-scale modernisation packages for the nation's navy. In 2025, the Navy announced a second Omiš-class patrol vessel, Umag (OOB 32), with anti-aircraft missile systems for €13.2 million. A year later, Croatia announced the procurement of two naval corvette warships worth €660 million to €1.6 billion.

== Mission ==
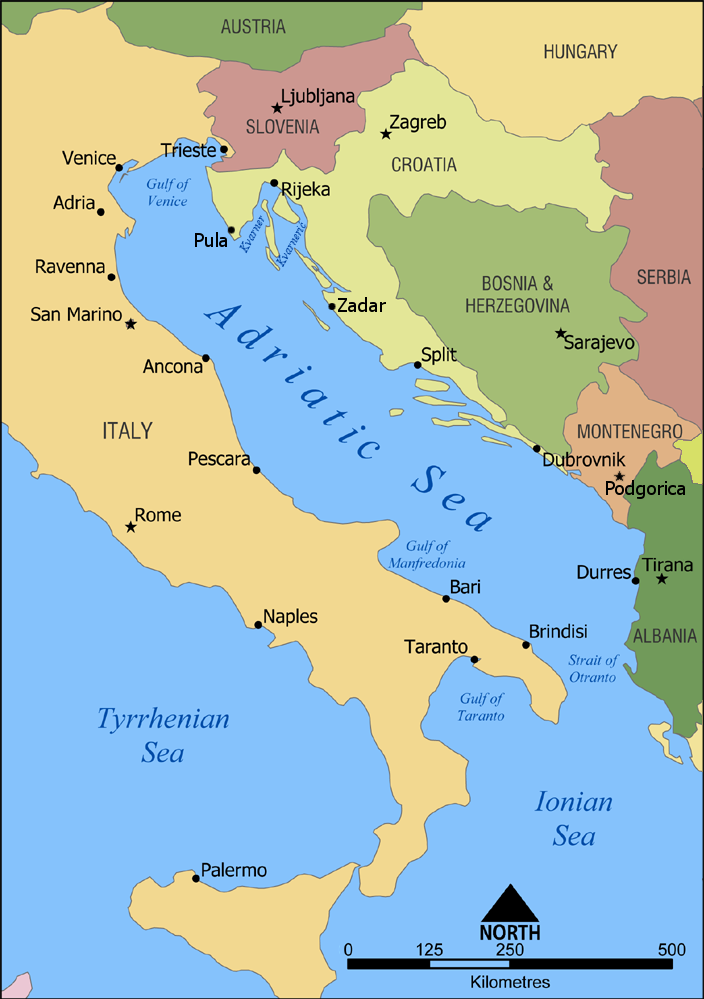
Adriatic Sea

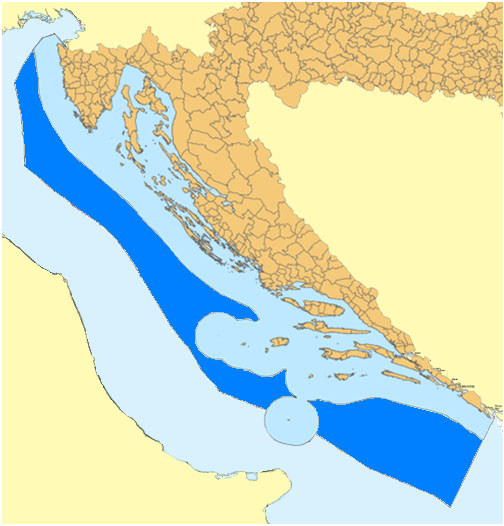
Croatian territorial waters and Exclusive economic zone of Croatia (blue)

The mission of the Croatian Navy (HRM) is to defend the integrity and sovereignty of the Republic of Croatia, to promote and protect its interest in the Adriatic Sea, islands and coast-lands. It carries and organizes the naval defense of the Republic of Croatia. The Croatian Navy fulfils its role by preparing itself and carrying out the following main tasks:

1. Deterring the threat to the Republic of Croatia by maintaining high level of competence, training and technical quality of equipment
2. Constant control of the Adriatic Sea and coast-land and monitoring of foreign warships' movement
3. Strengthening of the safety conditions on the Adriatic Sea and preserving the integrity of the maritime borders
4. Implementation of the program "Partnership for Peace in the Mediterranean"

== Croatian Navy organization ==
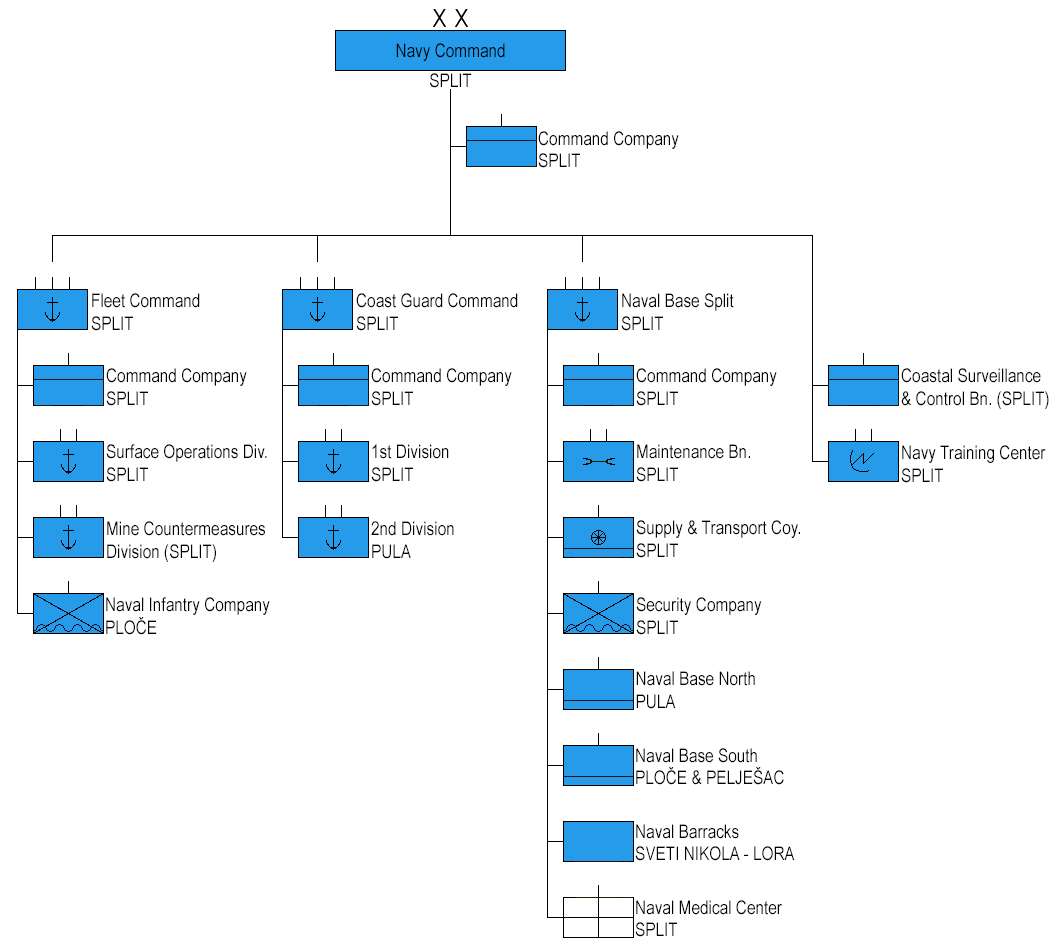
Navy Command organization as of April 2026 (click image to enlarge)

The following commands were created to carry out the mission of the Croatian Navy:

=== Navy Staff ===
The Navy Command in Split was reshuffled into the Navy Staff in 2013. The Navy Staff is led by a Ship-of-the-Line Captain, who apart from being the chief of the Navy Staff also serves as a deputy commander of the Navy. This position is currently held by SotL Capt. Milan Blažević. A Command company is attached to the Navy Staff.

=== Navy Flotilla ===
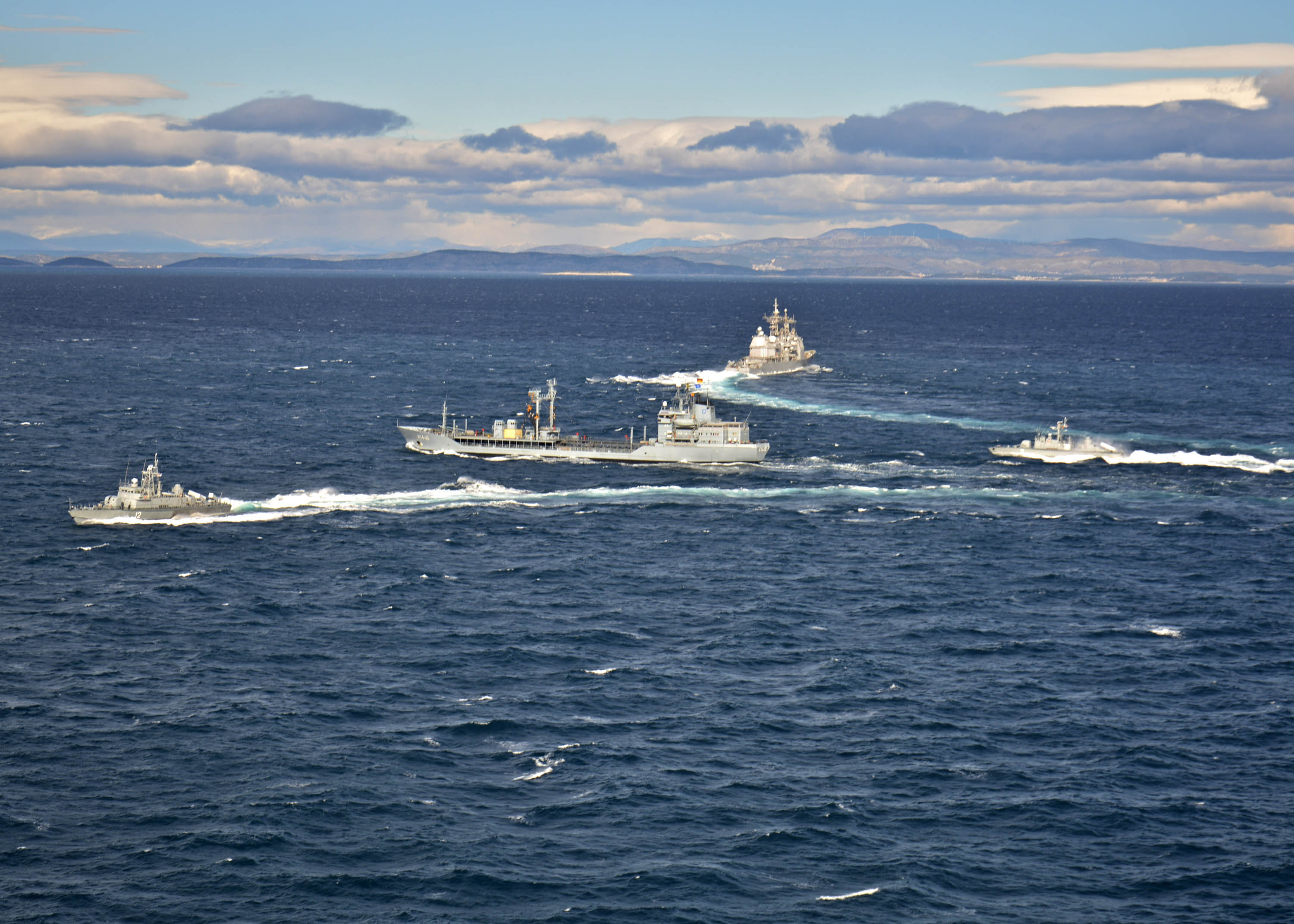
NATO Maritime Group 2 (SNMG2) ships with Croatian missile boats Šibenik and Zvonimir during an exercise

The Navy flotilla handles all tasks regarding anti-ship and anti-submarine warfare as well as minelaying and mine countermeasures, anti-terrorist activities and VIP/residential transport. Flotilla is administratively based in Lora naval base in Split. Current commander is ship-of-the-line captain Damir Dojkić. Today it is accordingly divided into three squadrons:

- Surface Operations Division, with 5 missile boats and 3 coastal mobile RBS-15 missile launchers, forming the main offensive capability of the Navy. Four missile boats and one mobile missile launcher have successfully fired missiles in live-fire exercises at sea targets as of 2016. Two Cetina-class minelayer-landing ships have also transported Croatian Army troops and AMVs to a NATO's "Trident Juncture" exercise in Spain in 2015.
- Mine Countermeasures Division, with one mine-hunter (LM-51), two REMUS autonomous underwater vehicles.
- Naval infantry company at Ploče

=== Coast Guard ===
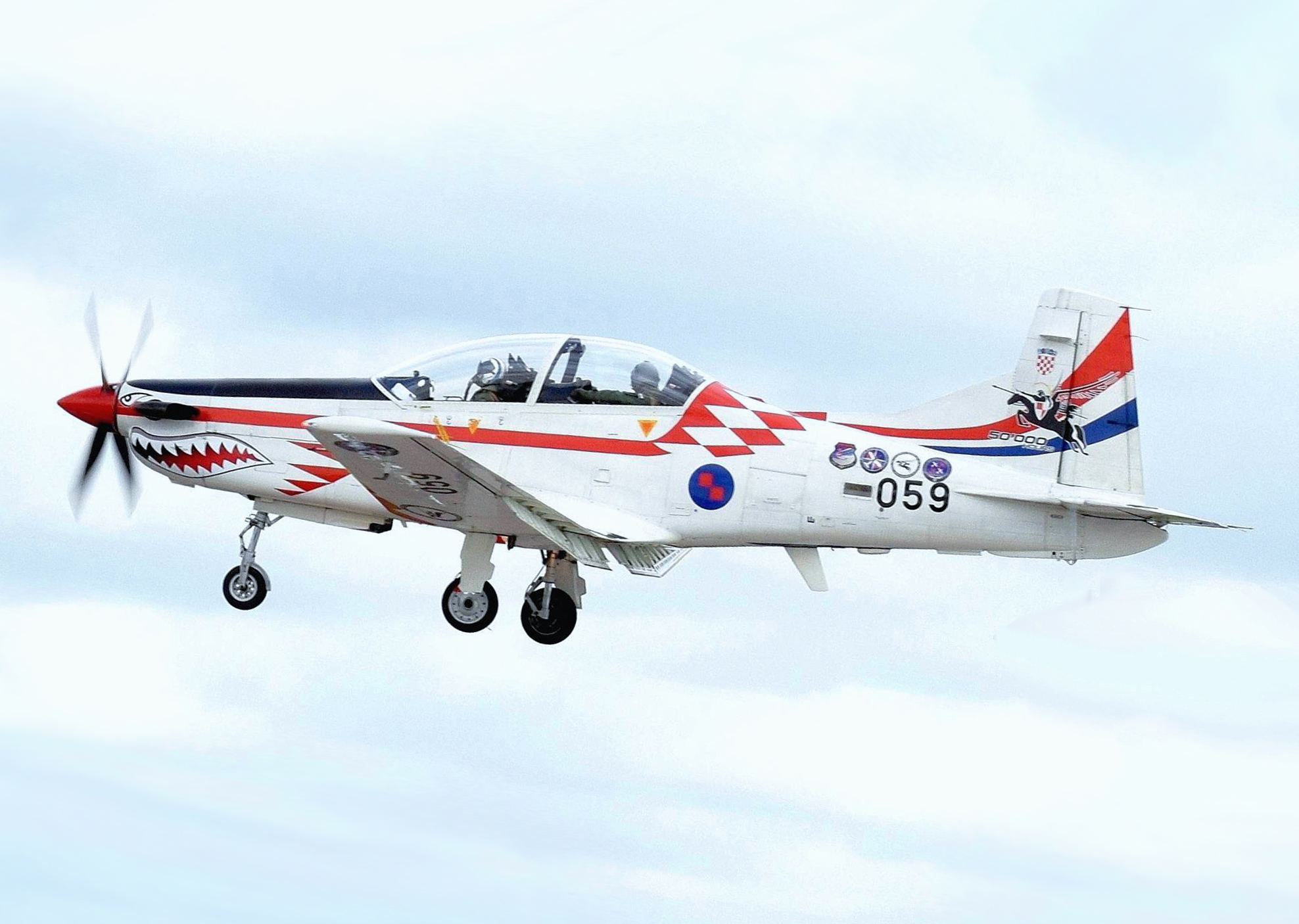
Two Croatian Air Force Pilatus PC-9 are operationally attached to Croatian Coast Guard for maritime patrol duties

The Coast Guard, founded in 2007, deals with peacetime duties, e.g. environment protection, fishing control, control of tankers, ballast waters, anti-terrorist activities, combating narcotics and trafficking of people etc. The Coast Guard's mission is to protect sovereign rights and carry out Croatia's jurisdiction in the Ecological and Fisheries Protection Zone, the continental shelf and the high seas. It also monitors vessels in the Croatian territorial waters. It provided training ship BŠ-72 Andrija Mohorovičić to EU's Operation Triton, rescuing migrants off the coast of Sicily in 2015. Its current commander is ship-of-the-line captain Ivo Raffanelli. It consists of two squadrons:

- 1st Division, based in Split with two former Yugoslav Mirna class patrol boats and other vessels
- 2nd Division, based in Pula handles Coast Guard tasks in northern Adriatic with two Mirna-class patrol boats and other vessels.

Four Air Force Mil Mi-171 helicopters (based at Divulje airfield near Split) and two Pilatus PC-9 planes (based at Zemunik Air Base) are operationally attached to the Coast Guard for maritime SAR and navy support and maritime patrol duties, respectively.

=== Sea Surveillance Battalion ===
The Sea Surveillance Battalion operates four Enhanced Peregrine naval radar posts at Lastovo, Dugi Otok, Mljet and Vis and additional nine GEM SC-2050XS naval radar posts at Savudrija, Brijuni, Mali Lošinj, Dugi Otok, Žirje, Vis, Lastovo, Mljet and Molunat. The battalion also operates the navy's signals and communications equipment.

=== Split naval base ===
The Split naval base's task is to manage the Lora Naval Base in northern part of Split, including "St. Nicholas" naval barracks, and to provide logistic support for the ships and vessels in Pula (Naval Detachment North) and Ploče (Naval Detachment South). It also manages Naval Training Center in Split and a medical center specifically designed to treat maritime disease, such as decompression sickness.

=== Ranks ===
==== Commissioned officer ranks ====
The rank insignia of commissioned officers.

NATO code	OF-10	OF-9	OF-8	OF-7	OF-6	OF-5	OF-4	OF-3	OF-2	OF-1
Croatian Navy
Croatian Navy	Admiral flote	Admiral	Viceadmiral	Kontraadmiral	Komodor	Kapetan bojnog broda	Kapetan fregate	Kapetan korvete	Poručnik bojnog broda	Poručnik fregate	Poručnik korvete

==== Other ranks ====
The rank insignia of non-commissioned officers and enlisted personnel.

NATO code	OR-9	OR-8	OR-7	OR-6	OR-5	OR-4	OR-3	OR-2	OR-1
Croatian Navy									No insignia
Croatian Navy	Časnički namjesnik	Stožerni narednik	Nadnarednik	Narednik	Desetnik	Skupnik	Razvodnik	Pozornik	Mornar

== Vessels ==
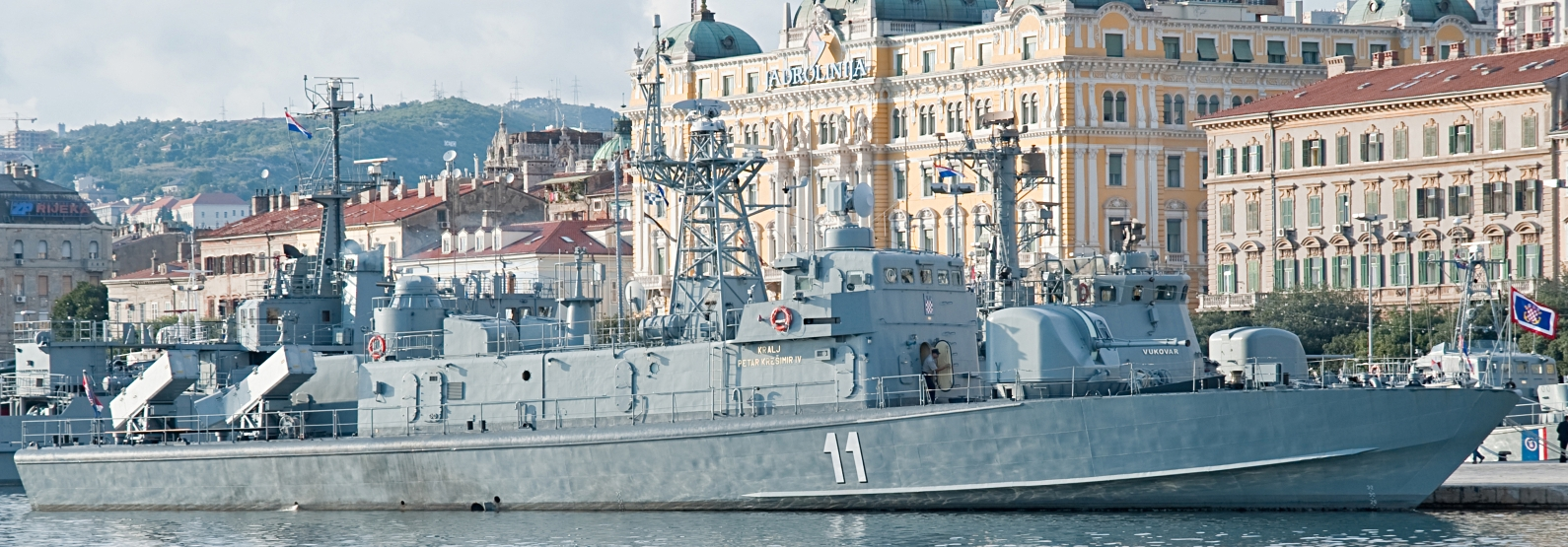
RTOP-11 Kralj Petar Krešimir IV

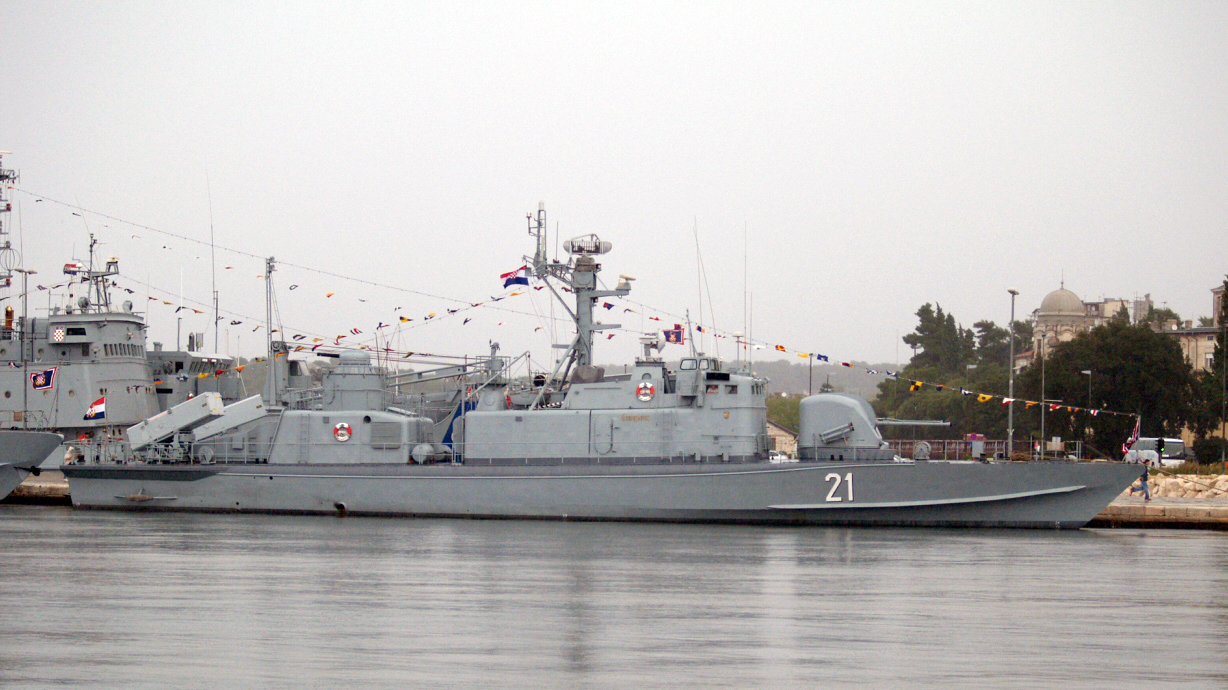
RTOP-21 Šibenik

External videos
- RTOP-12 firing an RBS-15 missile, YouTube video
- Navy's live fire exercise, October 2016, YouTube video

The Croatian Navy operates mostly vessels that were captured from the disintegrating Yugoslav Navy during the Croatian War of Independence in 1991. Most of those have been extensively overhauled or modernized (such as Šibenik (RTOP-21), extensively overhauled in 1991 to match the Kralj class), especially after the navy introduced RBS-15B missiles in its service instead of Soviet P-20s that used to be standard Yugoslav equipment. However, out of five missile boats, main combatant vessels, only Šibenik served under Yugoslav flag. Some ships were captured laid or unfinished in the docks and were finished by Croatians (such as Kralj Petar Krešimir IV (RTOP-11) in 1992). Kralj Dmitar Zvonimir (RTOP-12) (commissioned in 2001) as Krešimir's improved design and Cetina-class minelayer-landing ships were built and commissioned in Croatia (1993 and 1995, respectively). Two Helsinki-class missile boats RTOP-41 Vukovar and RTOP-42 Dubrovnik (built in 1985/6) were purchased from Finland in 2008, while a small minehunter LM-51 Korčula was built in 2006.

Krešimir underwent an extensive overhaul and engine replacement in 2014 while Zvonimir, being built during international arms embargo against former Yugoslav countries in the 1990s and thus featuring a mix of Russian and western equipment, also underwent an overhaul in 2015.

Navy also operates several armed landing crafts, while one school ship (BŠ-72 Andrija Mohorovičić) built in 1972 and one salvage ship (BS-73 Faust Vrančić) built in 1976 are a part of the Coast Guard. Croatian forces also operate about 20 other auxiliary vessels and crafts.

The Coast Guard's backbone are four Mirna class patrol boats built during the early 1980s. Their radar equipment was modernized in 2007 and stern anti-aircraft guns have been replaced with a hoist with semi-rigid-hulled inflatable boats in 2009-2012 to help in their intercepting duties. These aging patrol boats will be replaced in 2016-9 with 5 OOB-39 project ships currently under construction in Brodosplit shipyard, which is the first major modernization of Croatian Navy in a while. Construction of the first out of the projected 5 vessels was scheduled to start in 2007, however the international tender for the construction of 5 vessels was published only on 24 April 2013. The tender called for the acquisition of a total of 5 inshore patrol boats which are to be 43.5 meters long, with a displacement of roughly 220 tons and a maximum sustained speed of at least 28 knots. They will be armed with a Turkish made 30 mm Aselsan SMASH stabilized remote weapon station and two 12.7mm heavy machine guns along with a MANPADS launcher. The order was placed with Brodosplit in April 2015 and the keel of the first ship was laid in September of the same year. As projected, the first vessel was to enter service in the beginning of 2017, the second and third in 2017, the fourth in 2018 and the last one in 2019. Units were projected to cost around 10 million euros, respectively. The first prototype ship, OOB-31 "Omiš" was commissioned by the Croatian Navy on 7 December 2018. Four additional ships are under construction at Brodosplit shipyard as of November 2020.

Previously reported plans for the purchase of 2-4 offshore patrol vessels (OPV) or corvettes have been cancelled due to budgetary constraints but the 2015 strategic defence review envisages the procurement of a second-hand OPV by 2024. Politicians and military figures continue to discuss construction of a domestic-build OPVs or surface combatants in the post-2020 time period but this is an unfunded project. The Navy commander, rear admiral Stipanović, stated in October 2016 that the introduction of a new missile system (replacing the existing RBS-15) will be planned accordingly and executed together with construction of new OPVs.

The Croatian Navy also operates several 11m RIBs (Rigid Inflatable Boat) used by the Special Forces Command, specifically for explosive ordinance disposal. The craft were donated by the US military, estimated at $5.1 million, with the Ministry of Defense purchasing one in 2022 for $1.6 million. US Defense Attaché Colonel Scott McLearn stated that Croatia is a "Close NATO partner and ally" and that both armed forces "Have been working closely together for the past 30 years" at a meeting with Croatian officials and press.

== Coastal and other equipment ==
Model	Image	Origin	Type	Quantity	Notes
Radars
AN/FPS-117		United States	L-Band, AESA, 3D radar	4	Budget approved for modernisation in 2026.
Enhanced Peregrine	—	United States	C-band Aaa	4	Modernised from the Falcon-2 which was ordered in 1998.
GEM SC-2050XS	—	Italy	Naval surveillance radar posts	9	
Weapons
RBS-15B Aaa		Sweden	Anti-ship missile	47	RBS-15 MkI, first generation of the family in its surface-to-surface variant.
MOL Mobilni obalni lanser		Sweden Czech Republic	Anti-ship, mobile coastal TEL	3	RBS-15 launcher of the Croatian Navy, based on a Tatra truck.
M90		—	Naval mine	—	
Miscellaneous equipment
REMUS		United States)	AUV Autonomous underwater vehicles	—	Received from the USA
R-2M		Yugoslavia Croatia	Swimmer delivery vehicles	—	

== Naval education ==
Croatia has a long history of naval education and training. Between 1857 and 1918 an Austro-Hungarian naval academy was located in Rijeka with NCO training school in Šibenik. Royal Yugoslav Navy founded a three-year naval academy in Gruž (Dubrovnik) in 1923 (later joined by naval staff college in 1937) while a school for petty officers was opened in Šibenik. Post-WWII Yugoslav Navy set up a "Maršal Tito" naval academy in Split.

After a distinct Croatian Navy was founded in 1991, naval education went through various reforms and changes. Currently officers to be commissioned into the Croatian Navy receive their undergraduate education at Croatian Military Academy in Zagreb, which also hosts staff colleges and war colleges. A specific naval education and training centre is set up in Lora naval base in Split. Croatian Military Academy and Split University as of 2016 are in the process of opening a new undergraduate 4-year naval program in Split which is to have two main course tracks: naval engineering and seamanship.

== Gallery ==
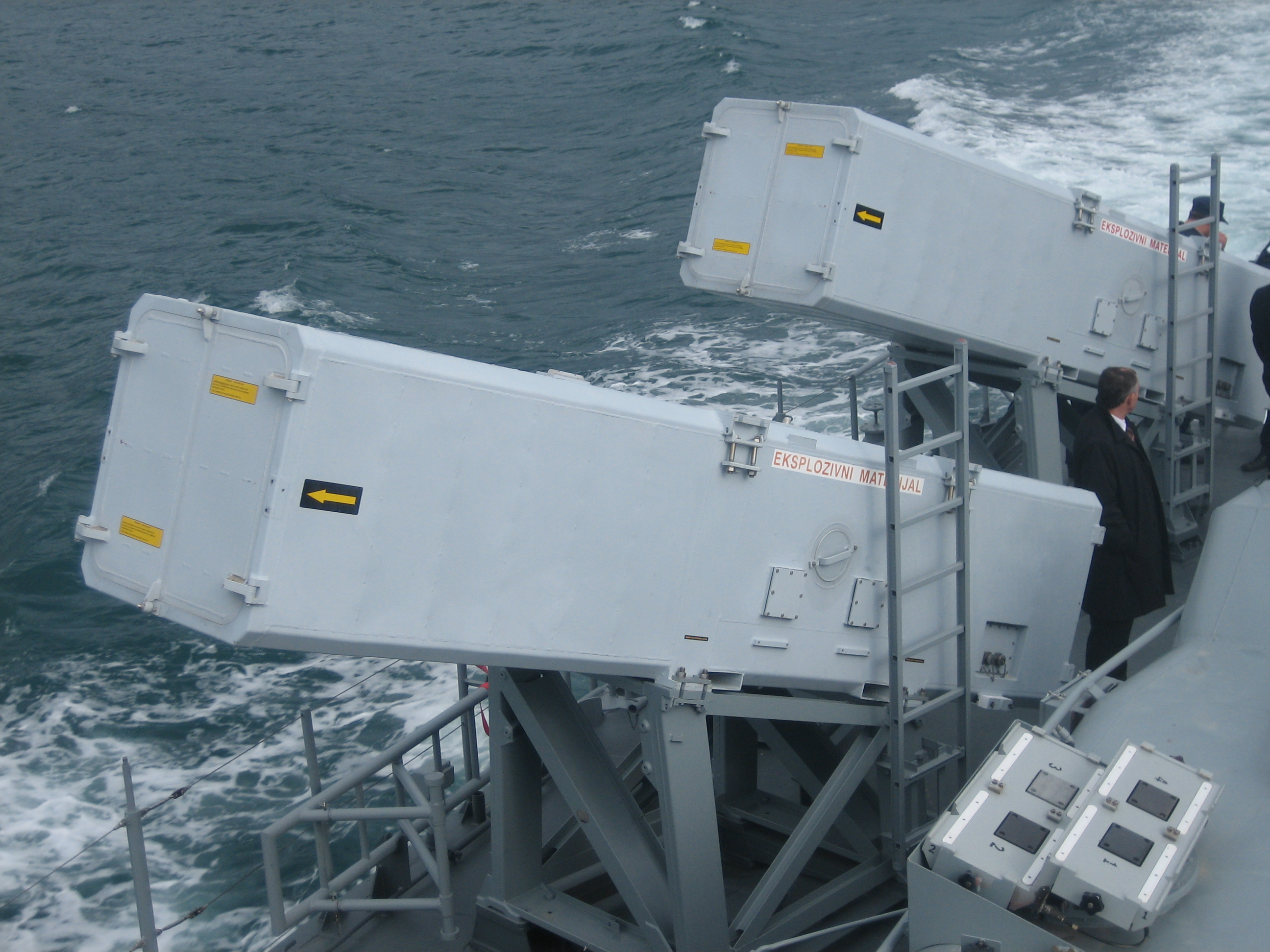
RBS-15 anti-ship missile launchers

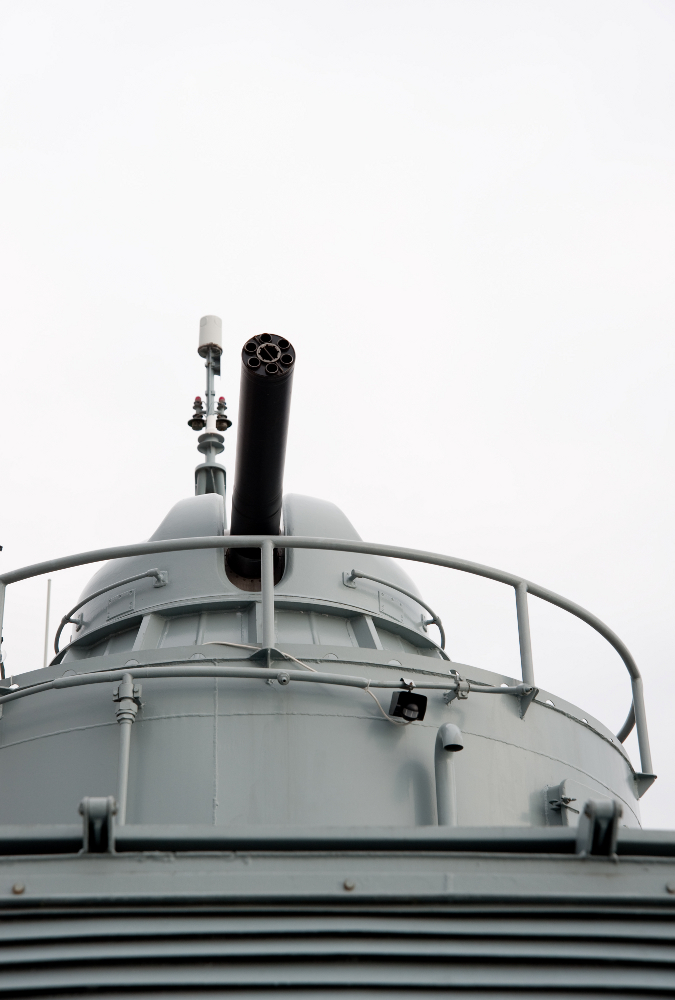
AK-630 gatling gun

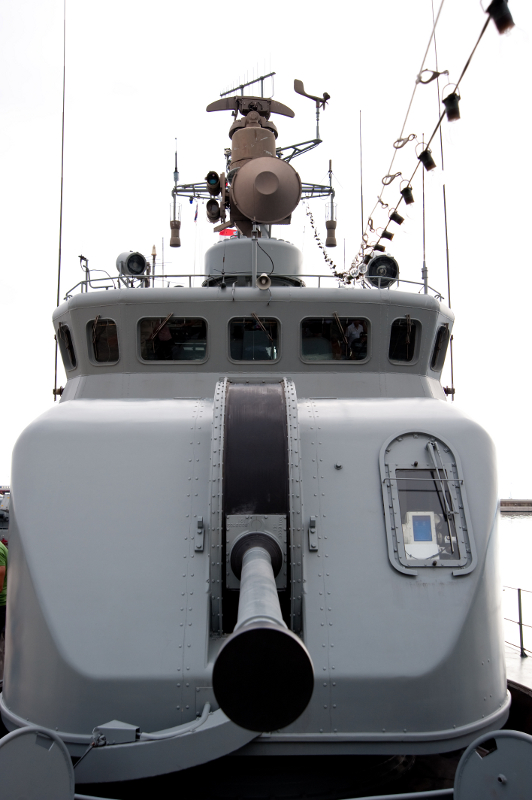
Bofors 57 mm/70 Mk1 gun

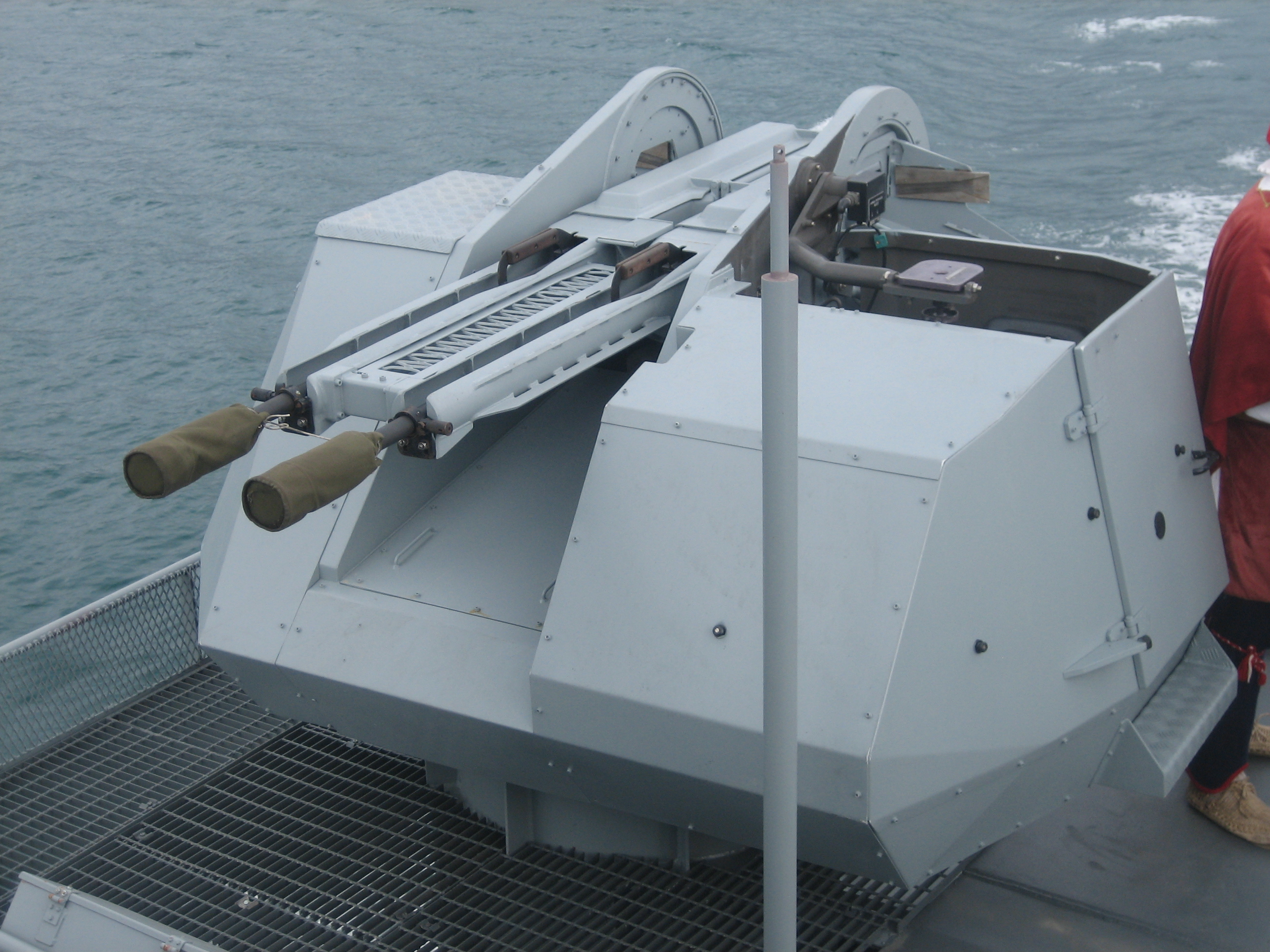
SAKO 23mm guns

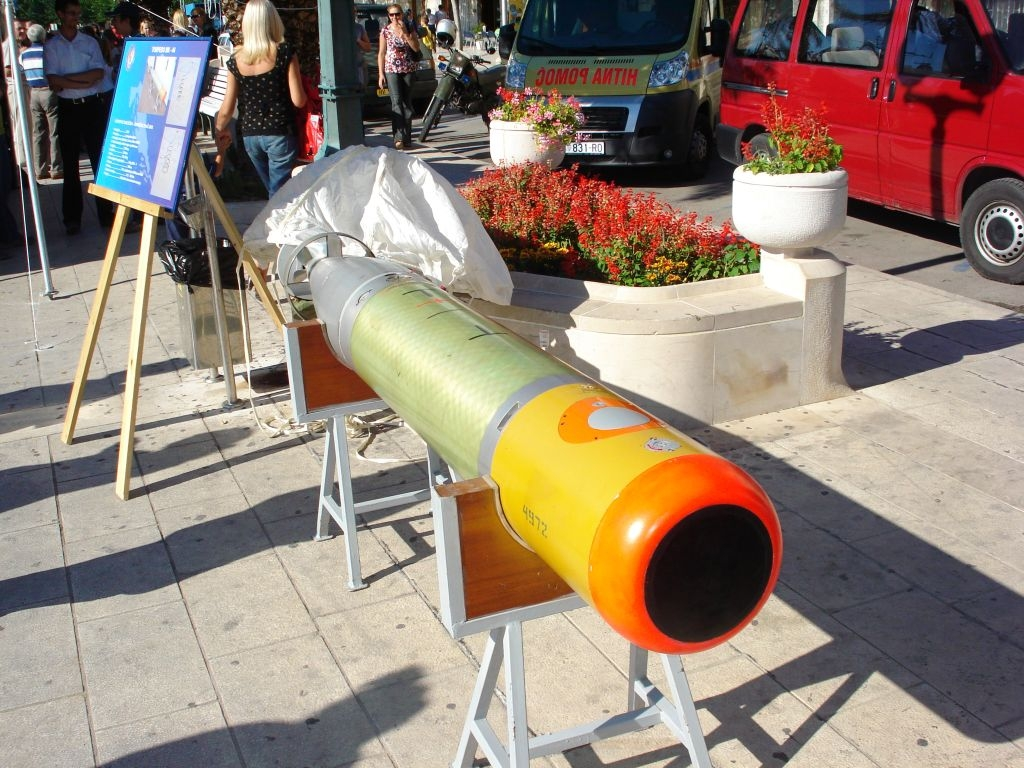
MK-44 torpedo

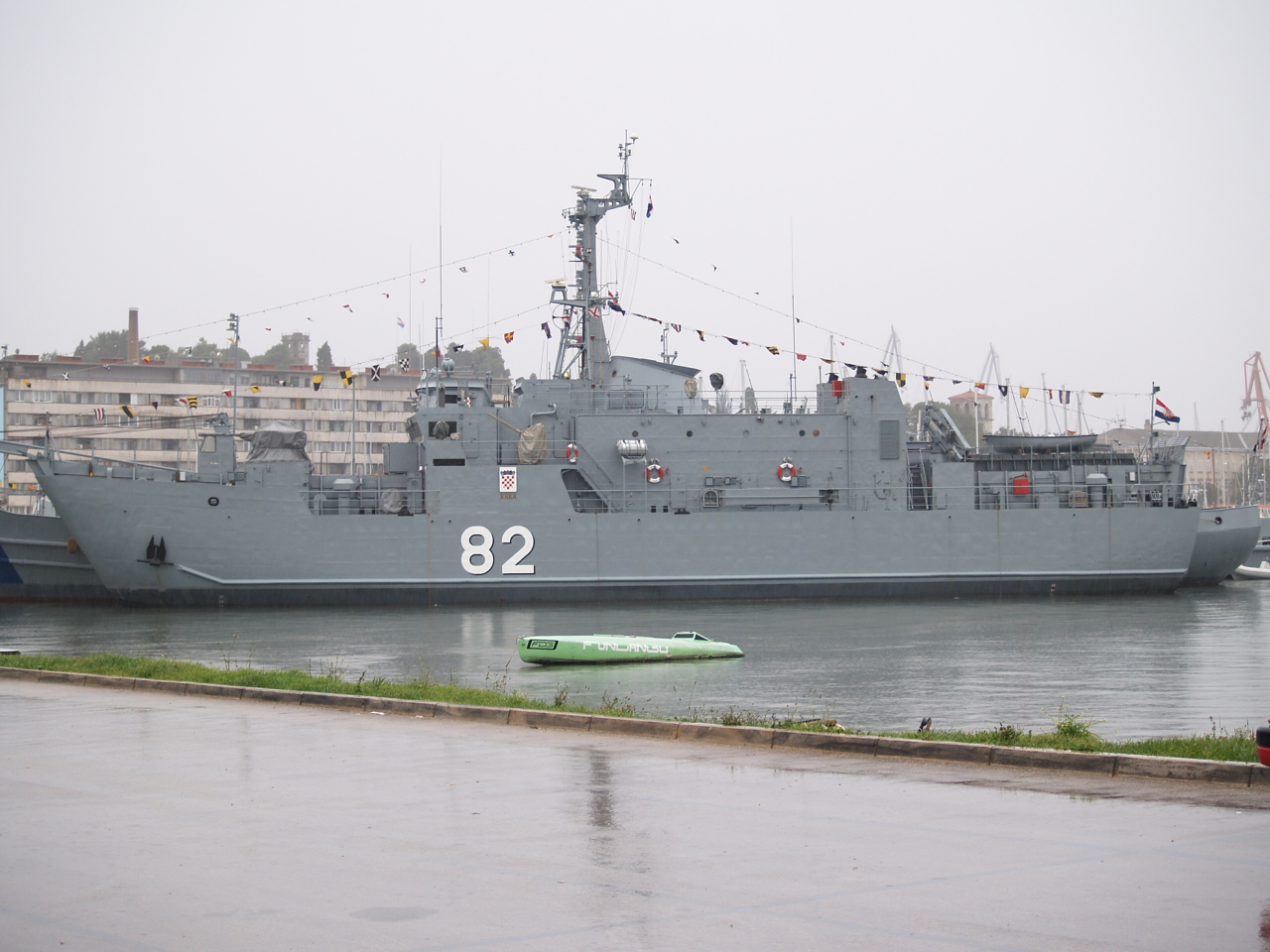
Landing craft and minelayer Krka

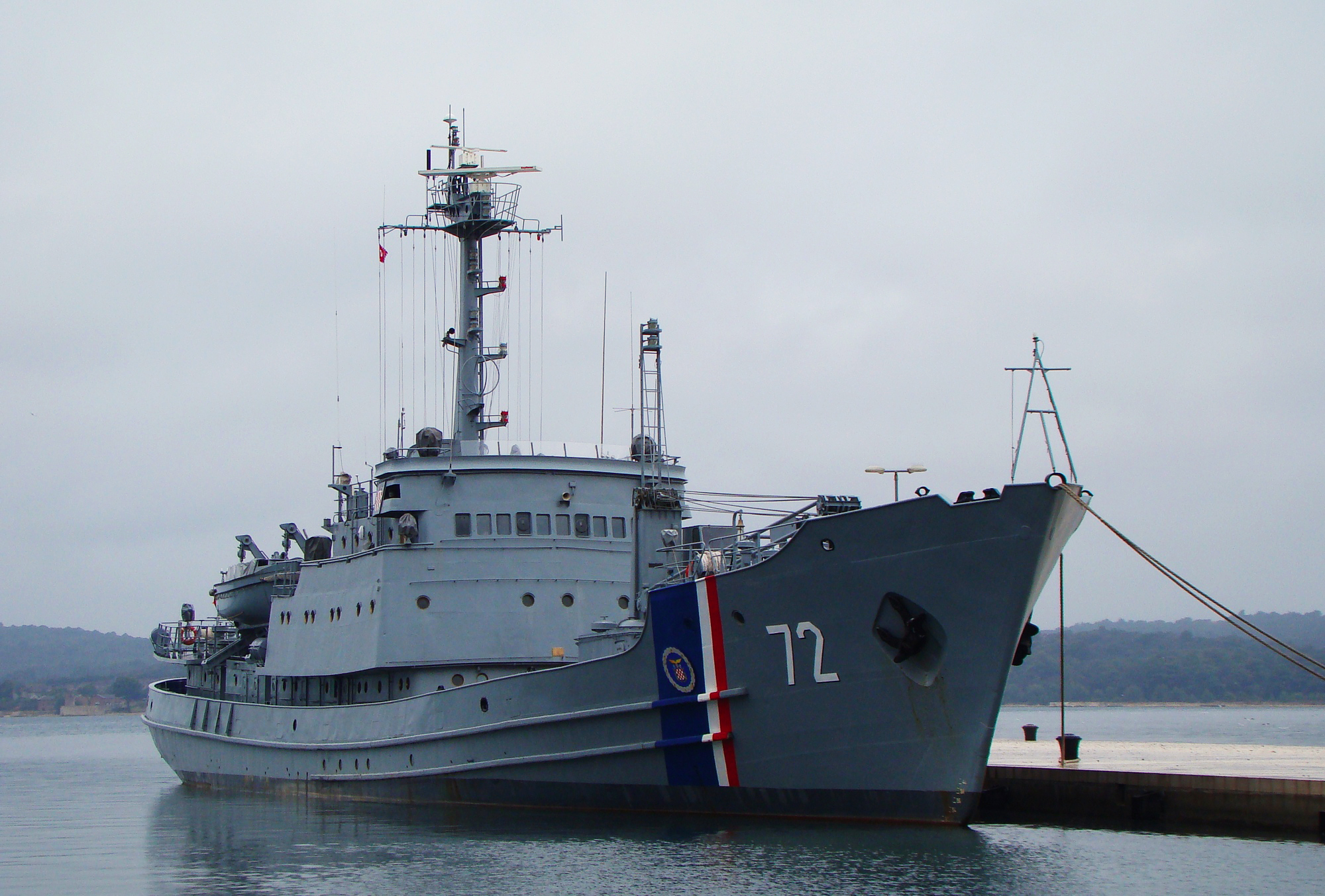
BŠ-72 Andrija Mohorovičić

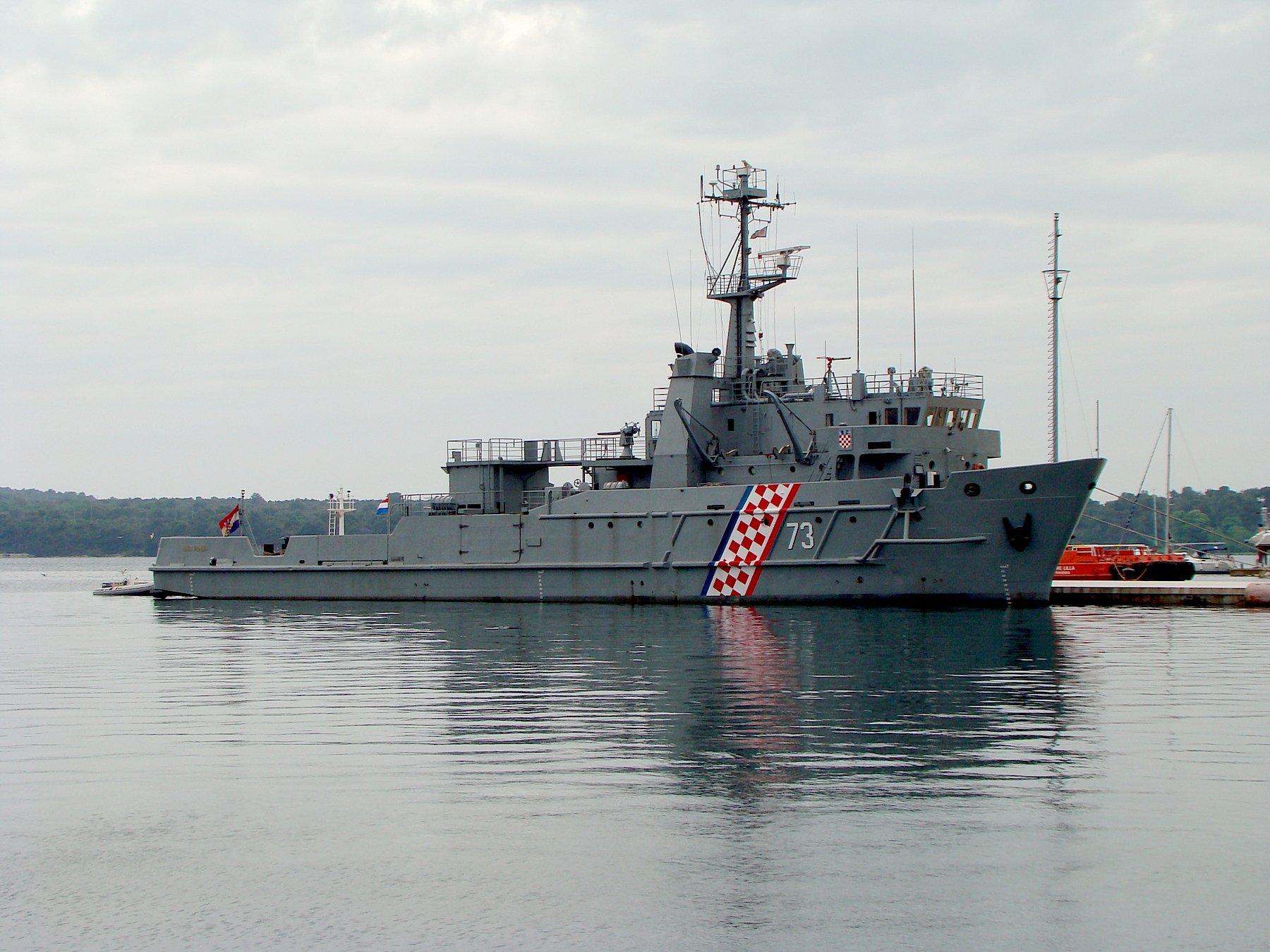
Salvage ship Faust Vrančić

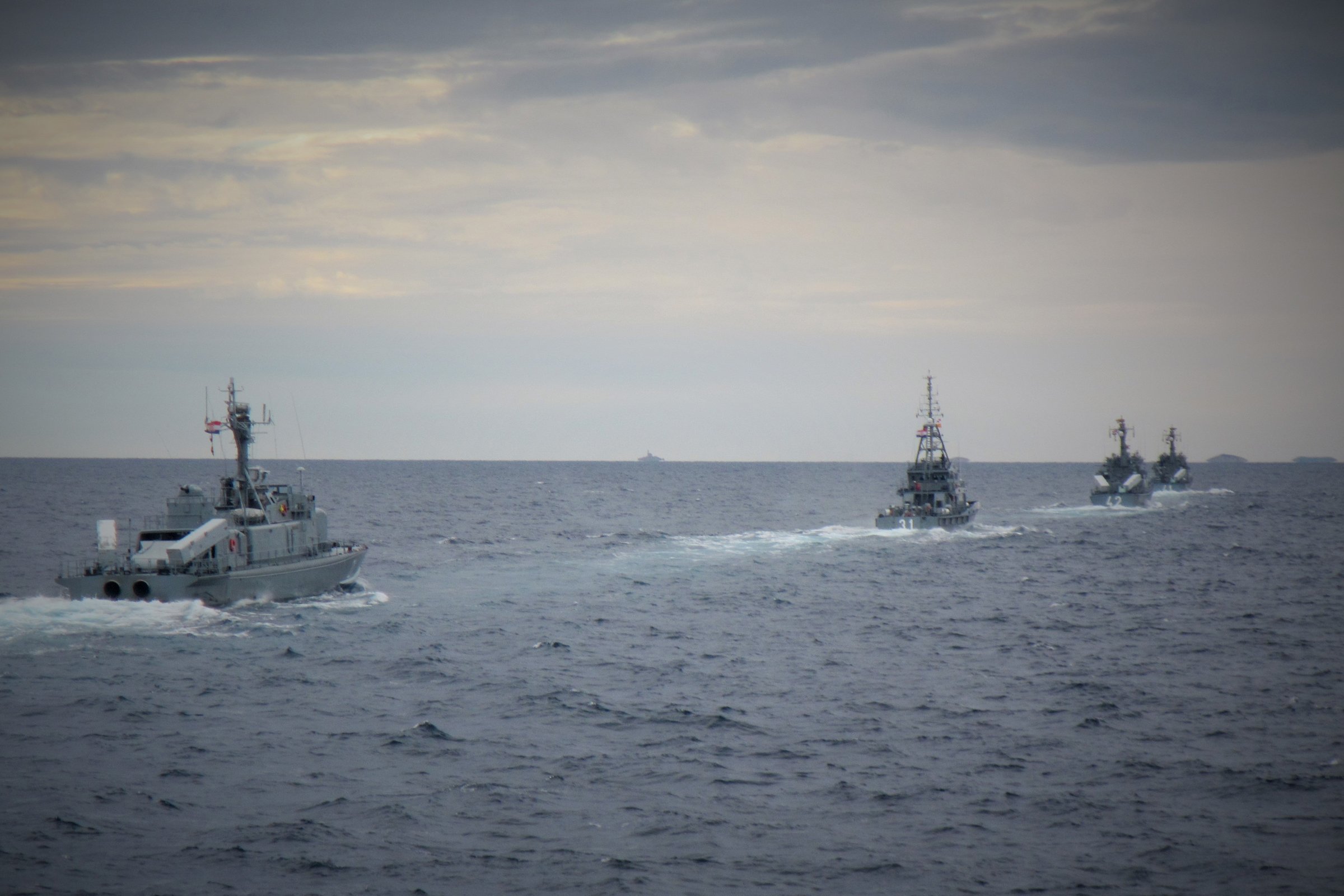
Croatian Navy Flotilla during exercise ''Harpun 21''

== See also ==
- List of admirals of Croatia
- Commander of the Croatian Navy
