= Croatian Coast Guard =

Coast Guard Of Croatia Obalna straža Republike Hrvatske
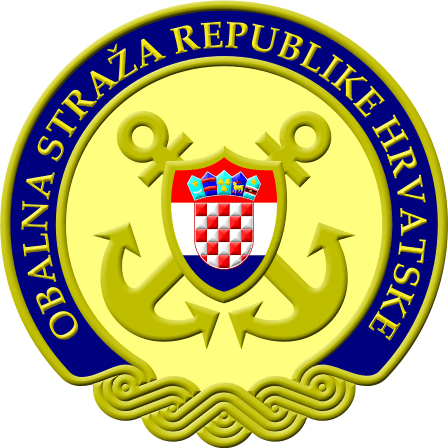
- Emblem

- Racing stripe

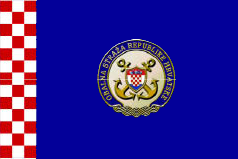
- Ensign

Agency overview
- Formed: 1 November 2007; 19 years ago

Jurisdictional structure
- Operations jurisdiction: Croatia
- Constituting instrument: Coast Guard Act of the Croatian Republic
- Specialist jurisdiction: Coastal patrol, marine border protection, marine search and rescue

Operational structure
- Parent agency: Croatian Navy

Facilities
- Planes: 2 x Pilatus PC-9; 4 x Mil Mi-8

Notables
- People: Commodore Marin Stošić, for Commander 2011-2014; Vice Admiral Zdravko Kardum, for Commander 2007-2011; Ivo Raffanelli, for Commander 2014-2017
- Anniversary: 4 August

The Croatian Coast Guard (Croatian: Obalna straža Republike Hrvatske) is a division of the Croatian Navy responsible for protecting the interests of Croatia at sea. The Croatian Navy is composed of classical naval forces structured into a flotilla and the Coast Guard that solely consists of ships with peacetime duties, e.g. protection of ecology, fishing, control of tankers, ballast waters, combat against terrorism, human trafficking, and narcotics.

== History ==
On 13 September 2007, the Croatian Parliament passed a bill establishing the Croatian Coast Guard. The Coast Guard's mission is protect sovereign rights and carry out Croatia's jurisdiction in the Ecological and Fisheries Protection Zone, the continental shelf and the high seas. The Coast Guard will also monitor vessels sailing in the Croatian territorial waters. If vessels are caught violating Croatian or international regulations and disregard warnings by the Coast Guard, Coast Guard ships and airplanes are authorized to pursue them and if necessary open fire, while taking care not to jeopardize the lives of the vessel's crew.

Under the law, the commander of the Coast Guard is a Navy officer who is appointed and relieved of duty by the President of the Republic at the government's proposal.

== Organization ==
Ships of Croatian Navy under the Command of Coast Guard:

- Coast Guard Command
- 1st Division – Split
  - OB-01 Novigrad
  - OB-02 Šolta
  - OOB-31 Omiš
  - BŠ-72 Andrija Mohorovičić
  - SB-73 Faust Vrančić
  - PT-71 Meduza
  - Tug LR-71
  - Modrulj 1
- 2nd Division – Pula
  - OB-03 Cavtat
  - OB-04 Hrvatska Kostajnica
  - Tug LR-73
  - Modrulj 2

Croatian part of Adriatic Sea is also controlled by Croatian Police – Maritime and Harbormasters' offices (Lučka kapetanija) whose ships are marked similar to Navy ships. Besides the warships, the Coast Guard has at its disposal two Pilatus PC-9 aircraft and four Mil Mi-171 helicopters of the Croatian Air Force.

== Fleet ==
The cornerstone of the Coast Guard forces are four Mirna class patrol boats (OB-01 to 04). They were upgraded with new radars and their stern anti-aircraft guns have been replaced with hoists for a semi-rigid inflatable. These are to be augmented and eventually replaced by an entirely new class. Coast Guard possess one new offshore patrol ship OOB-31 Omiš built in Brodosplit which is lead ship in future class.

Two "Modrulj" rubber boats (15 m long) for surveillance of Croatian borders on the Adriatic and prevention of poaching in fisheries were handed over to the Croatian Coast Guard on March 10, 2026, in the Split military port of Lora. With this handover, the Coast Guard has six such boats.

== Gallery ==
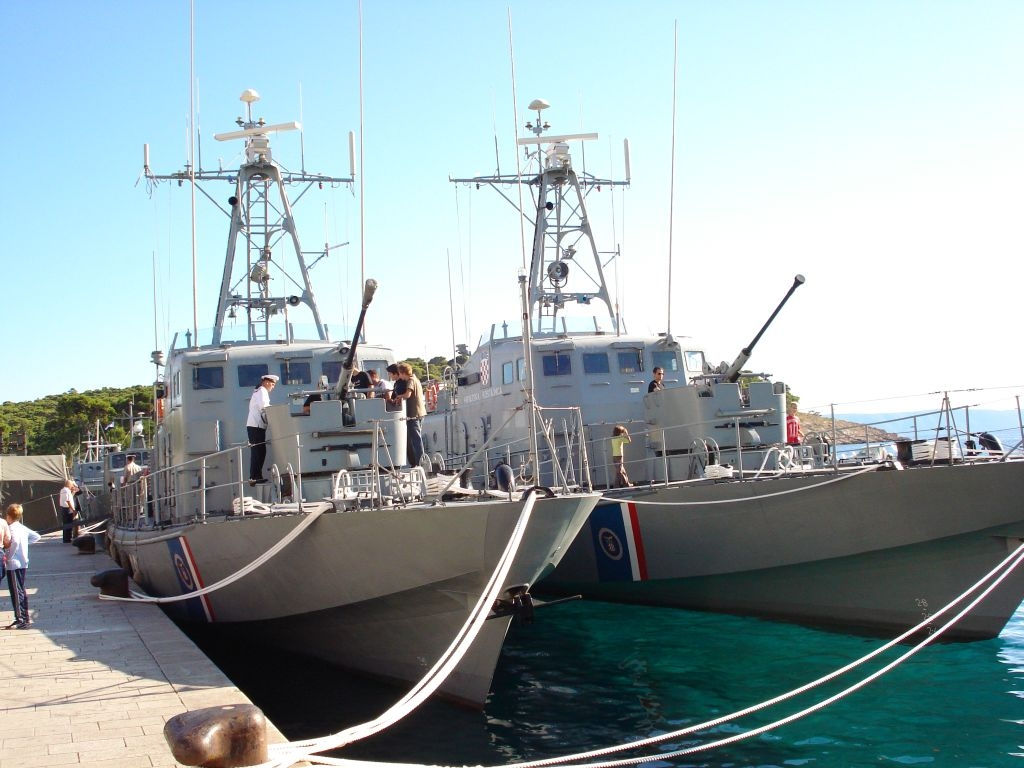
Croatian Navy's patrol boats OB-03 Cavtat and OB-04 Hrvatska Kostajnica

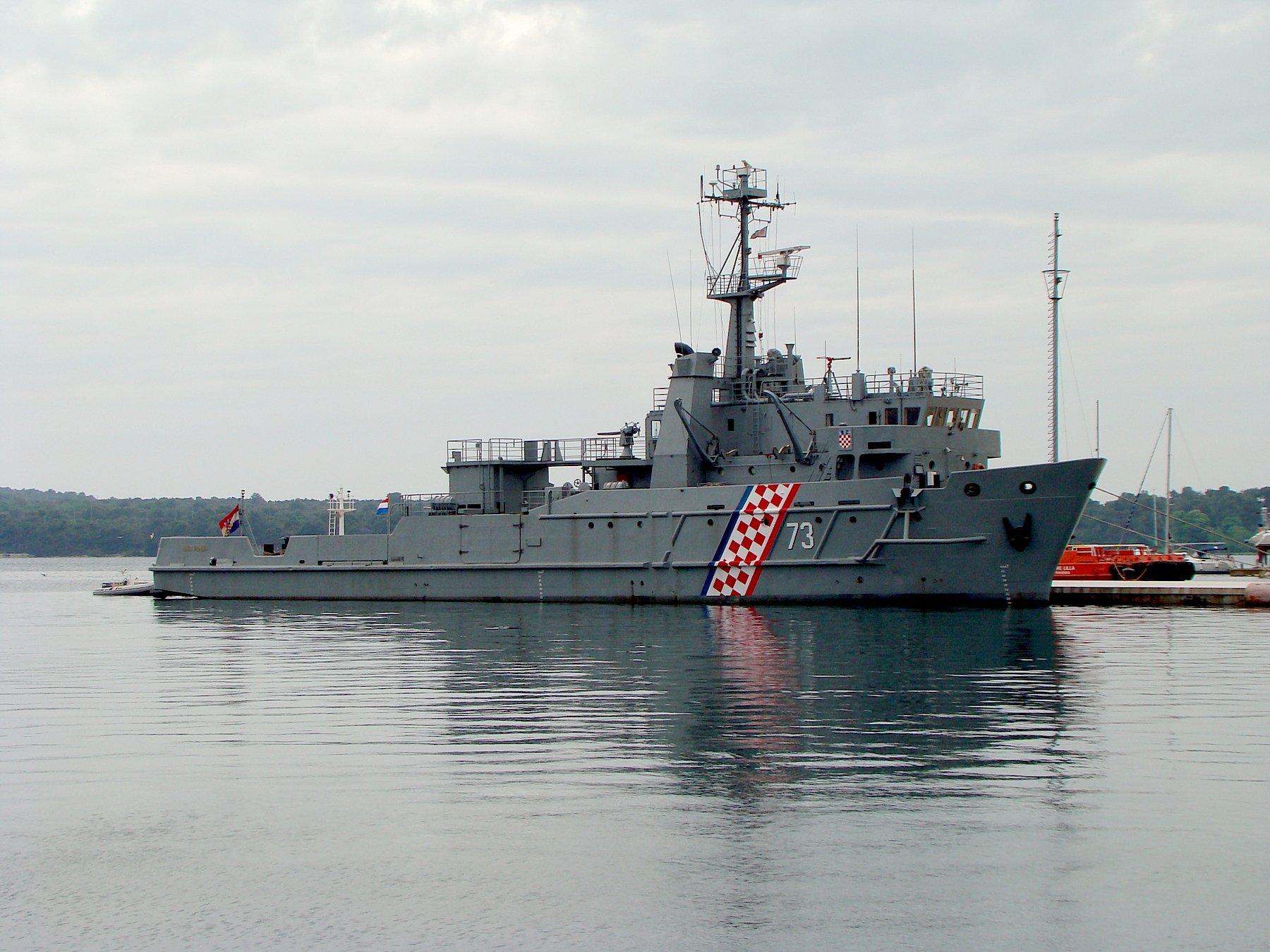
BS-73 Faust Vrančić

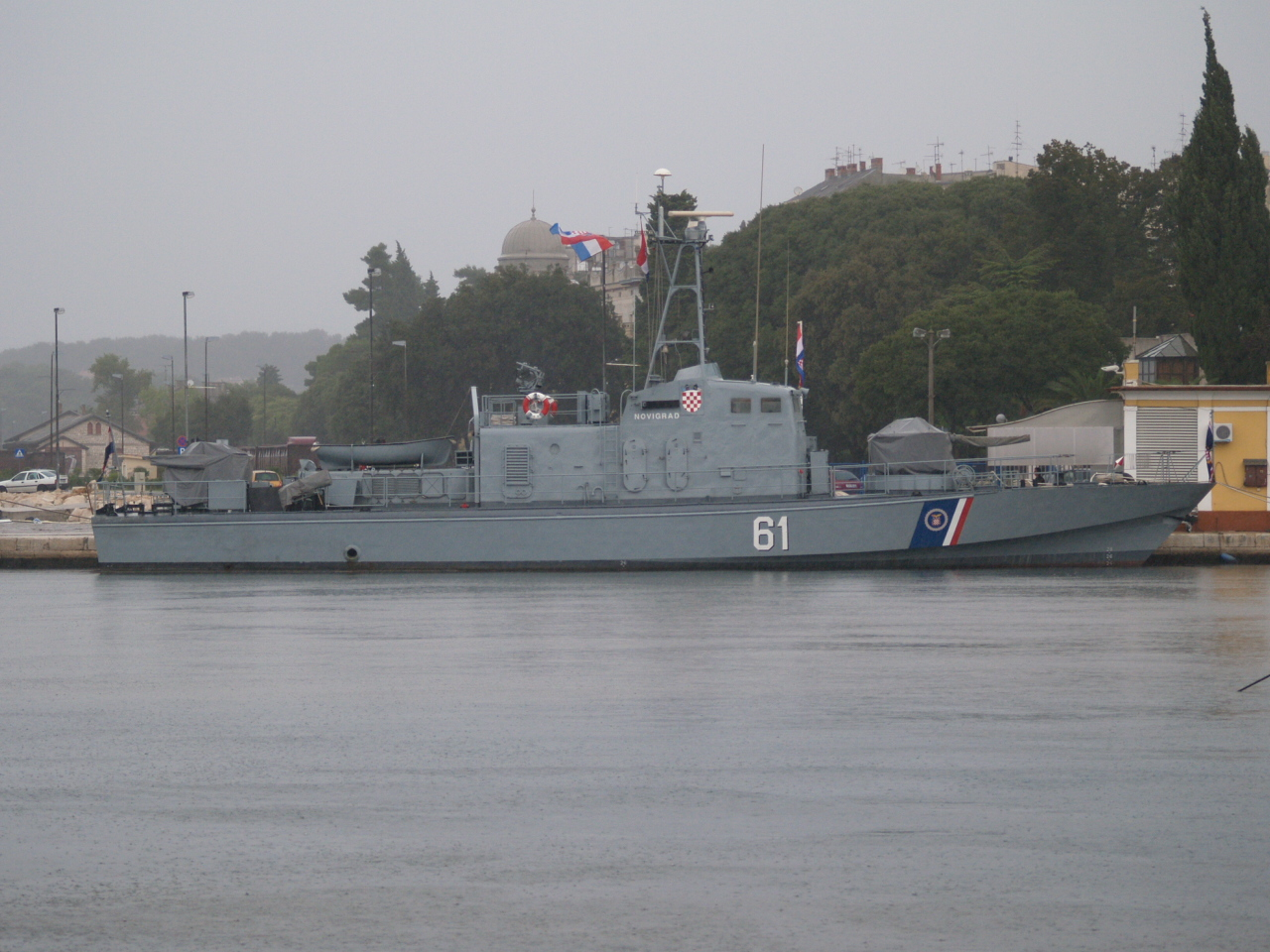
OB-01 Novigrad with old pennant number and racing stripes

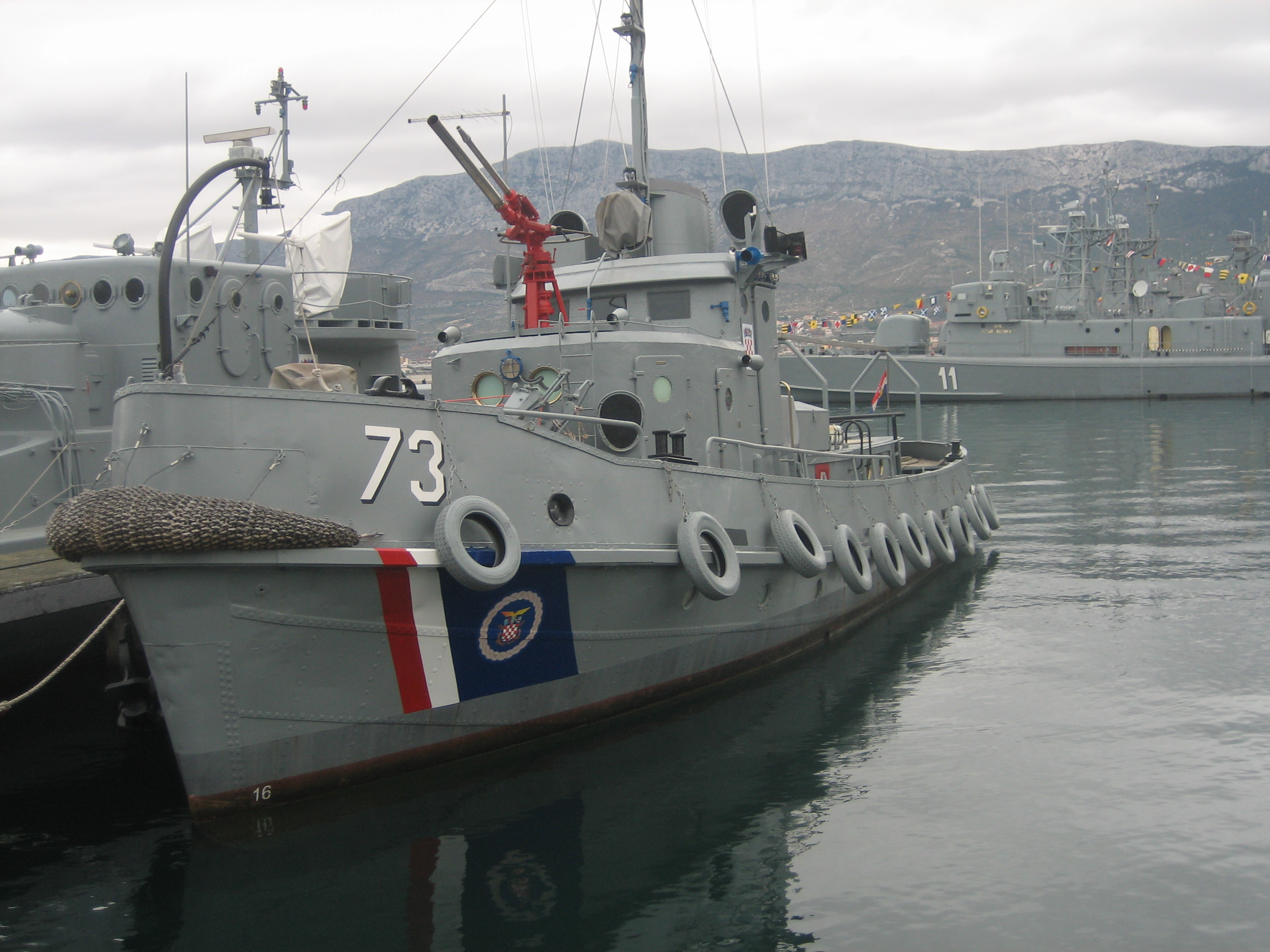
Tug LR-73

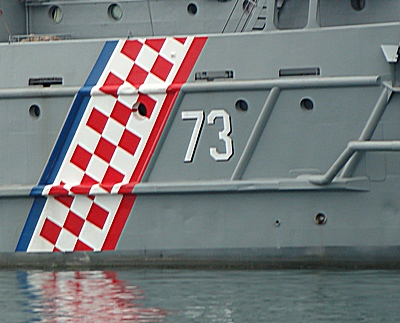
New racing stripes on Croatian Navy's BS-73 Faust Vrančić

== See also ==
- Port captaincies of Croatia
