= Ivo Raffanelli =

Croatian naval officer

- Born: 1 March 1965 (age 61); Makarska, SR Croatia, SFR Yugoslavia
- Military career
- Branch: Croatian Navy
- Rank: Rear Admiral
- Commands: Commander of the Croatian Navy

Ivo Rafanelli (born 1 March 1965) is a Croatian naval officer currently serving as Commander of the Croatian Navy.

He graduated from the Naval Military Academy in 1987 as a naval engineer.

Military offices
Preceded by Predrag Stipanović	Commander of the Croatian Navy; 2018–	Incumbent
