= Sveto Letica =

- Born: 4 April 1926; Podgora, Kingdom of Serbs, Croats, and Slovenes
- Died: 6 November 2001 (aged 75); Split, Croatia
- Burial place: Lovrinac, Split, Croatia
- Relatives: Mirando Mrsić (nephew)
- Military career
- Allegiance: Yugoslavia; Croatia
- Branch: Yugoslav Navy; Croatian Navy
- Service years: 1942–1986; 1991–1996
- Rank: Captain (JA); Admiral (JNA); Fleet Admiral (HV)
- Nickname: Barba
- Commands: R-22 Pula; Croatian Navy
- Conflicts: World War II in Yugoslavia; Croatian War of Independence
- Awards: Order of Duke Trpimir; Order of Duke Domagoj; Order of Ban Jelačić
- Other work: Association of Croatian Navy Volunteers

Sveto Letica (4 April 1926 – 6 November 2001) was a Croatian admiral, and the first commander of the Croatian Navy.

== Biography ==
Letica was born in 1926 in Podgora, where he was involved in creating a Partisan Navy in 1942. He graduated at the Naval and War Academy. For 20 years he served on different warships of the Yugoslav Navy. He was Fleet commander, he was chief of a naval region, and before his retirement he served in Generalštab of JNA. He retired in 1986 with the rank of Vice Admiral of the JNA. By decree of the President of the Presidency of the SFRY from September 1986, he was retroactively promoted to the rank of admiral. The long-time experience of Letica was precious for Croatia when the Croatian Navy was established in 1991. On 12 September 1991, the President of the Republic, Franjo Tuđman, named him Commander of the Croatian Navy. He served as supreme navy commander until his second retirement on 1 June 1996. He was retired by decision of the President. In September 1991 he was confirmed rank of Admiral, and in March 1996 promoted in rank of Fleet Admiral (admiral flote).

Sveto Letica is buried in Lovrinac graveyard in Split.

== Career summary ==
=== Duties ===
- Commander of Croatian Navy - 12 September 1991 - 1 June 1996

=== Ranks ===
==== SFRY ====
- Rear Admiral (December 1974)
- Vice Admiral (December 1978)
- Admiral (September 1986)

==== Croatia ====
- Fleet Admiral (March 1996)

=== Decorations ===
- Order of Duke Trpimir
- Order of Duke Domagoj
- Order of Ban Jelačić
- Order of Croatian Trefoil
- Order of Croatian Wattle
- Commemorative Medal of the Homeland War
- Commemorative Medal of the Homeland's Gratitude.
