= Lora (Split) =

Harbor in Split, Croatia

Location
- Coordinates: 43°31′35″N 16°25′41″E

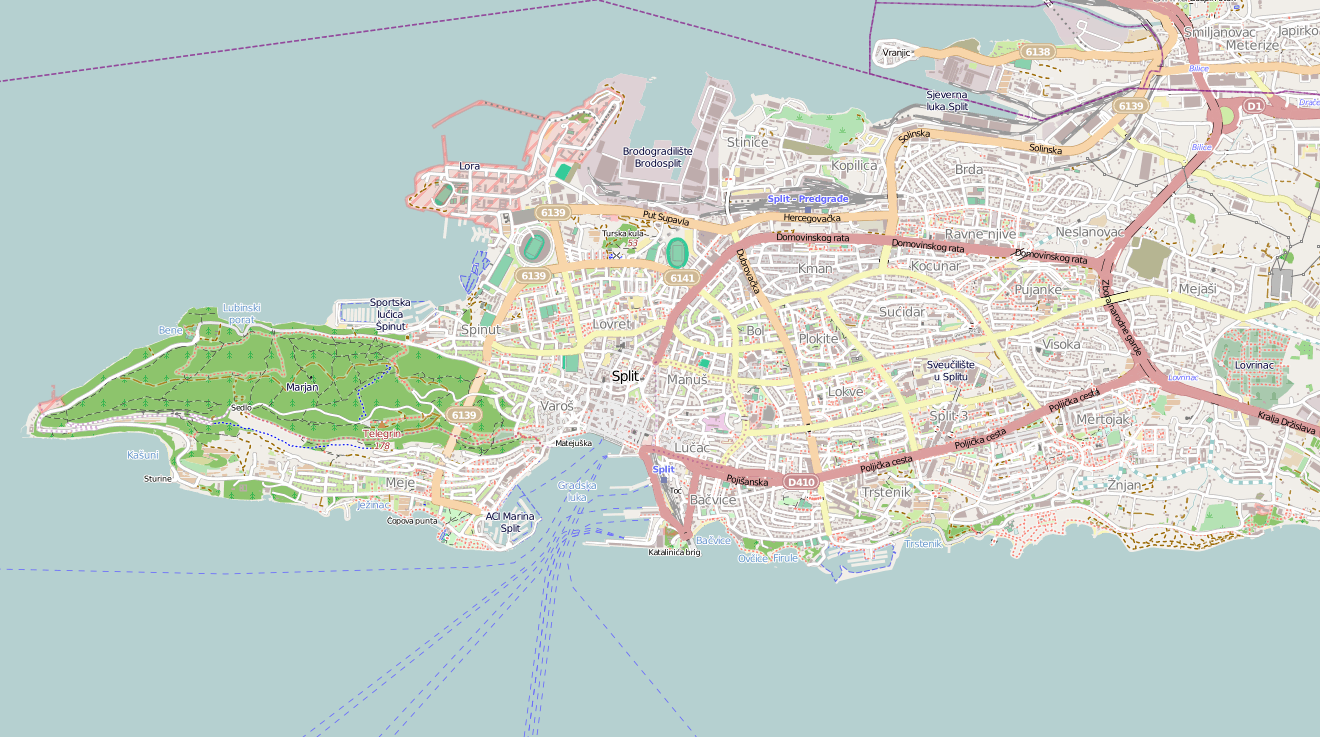
Lora naval base (striped red) on the northern side of Split

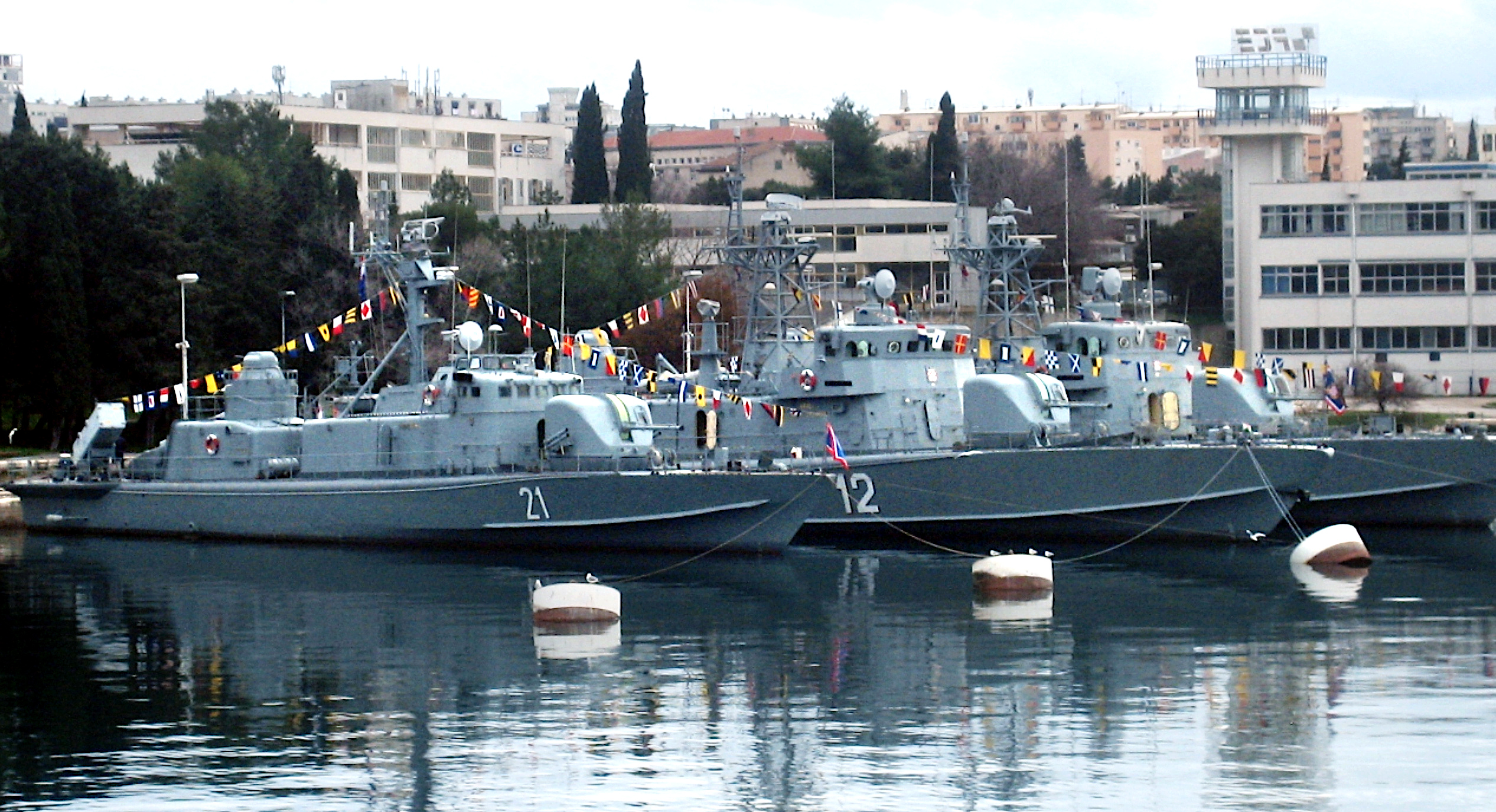
Croatian missile boats Šibenik, Zvonimir and Krešimir at Lora pier

Lora is a harbor in the northwestern part of Split, Croatia, in the Bay of Kaštela. It is currently used as a naval base of the Croatian Navy. Located right next to the Brodosplit shipyard, it has been an important naval base for the Yugoslav Navy (1945–1991) and its headquarters. Ever since its founding in 1991, Lora naval base has served as the HQ of Croatian Navy. In this capacity, it is the home port for nearly all ships of the fleet. Lora is also the HQ of Croatian Coast Guard.

Lora naval base hosts sport, educational and other naval facilities, as well as a naval memorial chapel dedicated to Croatian sailors who perished in Croatian War of Independence.

The only submarine that has served with Croatian Navy, Velebit, is on permanent display in Lora.
