= Predrag Stipanović =

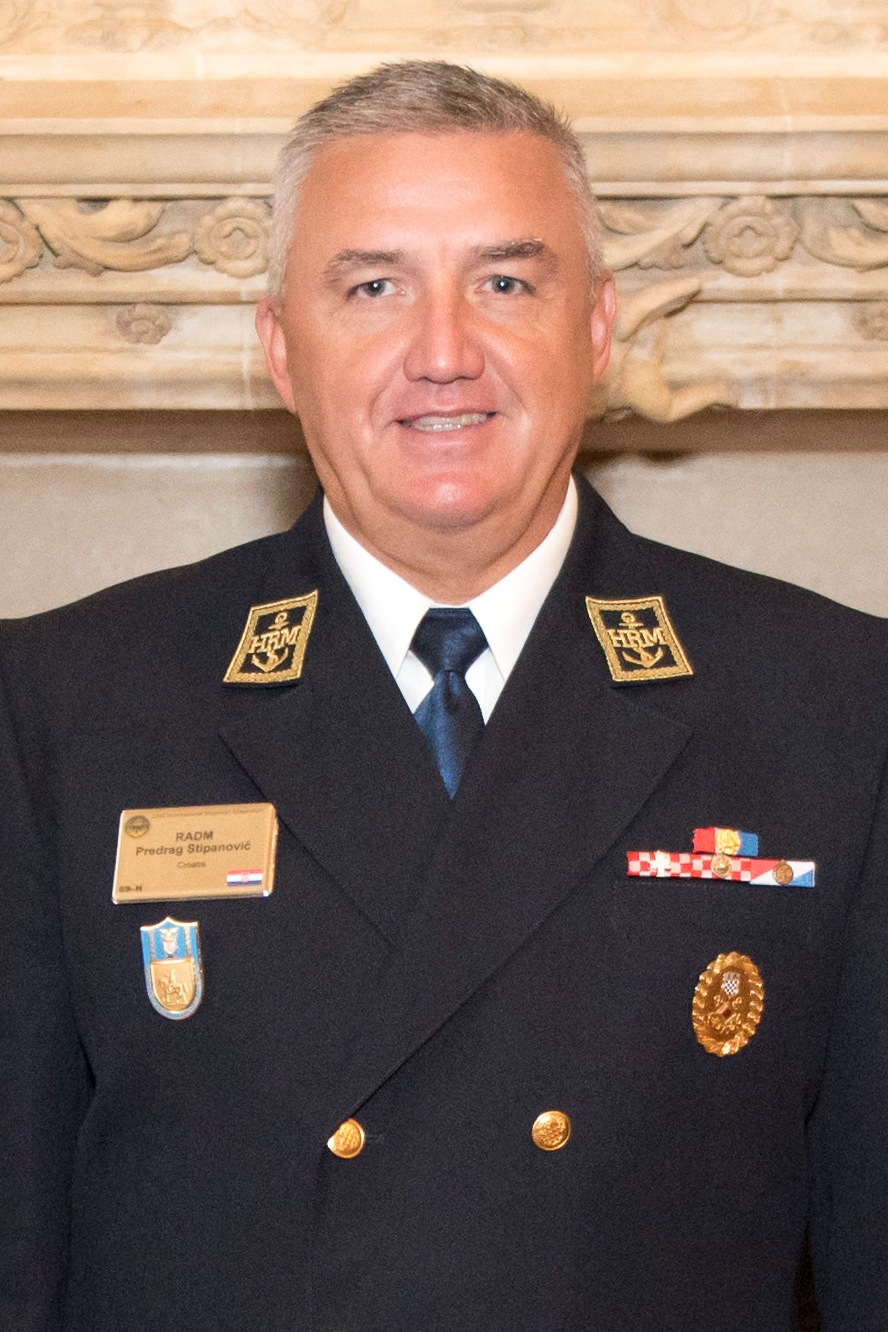
- Born: January 5, 1964; Osijek, SR Croatia, SFR Yugoslavia
- Military career
- Allegiance: Yugoslavia; Croatia
- Branch: Yugoslav Navy; Croatian Navy
- Service years: 1986–present
- Rank: Rear admiral
- Unit: RTOP-21 Šibenik
- Commands: RTOP-21 Šibenik; Croatian Navy
- Conflicts: Croatian War of Independence
- Awards: Order of Ban Jelačić; Order of the Croatian Trefoil

Predrag Stipanović (born 1964) is a Croatian rear admiral, since January 2018 serving as the Croatian Military Representative to NATO.

== Biography ==
Stipanović was born in 1964 in Osijek. He graduated from the 37th class of the Naval War Academy (Croatian: Vojna mornarička akademija) in Split in 1986. During the breakup of Yugoslavia and the outbreak of the Yugoslav Wars, he left the Yugoslav Navy and volunteered to join the fledgling Croatian Navy. Stipanović served in the navy during the Croatian War of Independence (1991-1995). He commanded missile boat Šibenik when it fired RBS-15 anti-ship missiles in live fire exercise "Posejdon 94" in October 1994, marking the successful introduction of that missile type in the Croatian Navy. In 1999, Stipanović graduated from Command Staff College "Blago Zadro" in Zagreb, between 2002 and 2003 he attended U.S. Naval War College in Newport, RI, while in 2007 he graduated from War Staff College "Ban Josip Jelačić" in Zagreb. Between 2013 and 2015, Stipanović held the post of the Chief of the Naval Staff and Deputy Commander of Croatian Navy. In January 2015 he assumed command of the Croatian Navy, becoming its 6th commander since foundation.

== Decorations ==
- Order of Ban Jelačić
- Order of the Croatian Trefoil
- Commemorative Medal of the Homeland War
- Commemorative Medal of the Homeland's Gratitude.
