= List of ships of the Yugoslav Navy =

Emblem of the JRM

The Yugoslav Navy (Serbo-Croatian: Jugoslavenska ratna mornarica; JRM) was the naval branch of the Yugoslav People's Army (Jugoslavenska narodna armija; JNA). Organized as a coastal defence force with the main task of preventing enemy landings on its long and indented coastline, the navy's inventory reflected its foreign relations as well as the growing capabilities of its domestic shipyards and scientific institutions. The period immediately after the end of the Second World War was marked by relying on equipment that was captured, salvaged or obtained from the Western Bloc through reparations or lend-lease programs.

Improved relations with the Soviet Union after Stalin's death meant the acquisition of Eastern military equipment was once again possible. This was soon after realized with torpedo and missile boats of Soviet origin being commissioned with the JRM. The 1960s and 1970s marked the start of a period of reliance on indigenous designs. Domestic naval programs developed by the Brodarski Institut from Zagreb and built in Yugoslav Shipyards included submarines, frigates, patrol boats, missile boats as well as other support ships, with some of them being exported to other countries.

The JRM came to its de facto end in 1991 with the escalation of the Croatian War of Independence. The Navy was engaged in imposing a naval blockade of Croatia which culminated in November with the Battle of the Dalmatian Channels. Having lost the majority of its naval infrastructure which was located in the now independent Croatia, the fleet eventually retreated to Boka Kotorska, Montenegro where it was officially disbanded in early 1992 with the remaining ships being commissioned with the new Navy of the Federal Republic of Yugoslavia. The FR Yugoslav Navy included around 80% of the JRM pre-war fleet, with the remaining 20% being lost or captured by Croatian Forces.

== Submarines ==
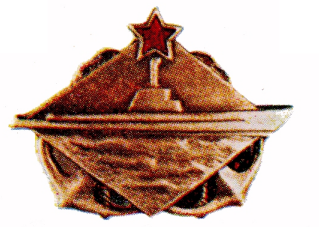
A submariner's badge

The JRM maintained a submarine force throughout its existence. The first submarines to be commissioned were three submarines captured or returned after the Second World War. Starting with the 1950s and the Sutjeska class Yugoslavia operated domestically built submarines. The Heroj class marked a significant technological leap in Yugoslav shipbuilding capabilities with the Brodogradilište specijalnih objekata (Special objects shipyard) in Split becoming the shipyard where all of the remaining boats would eventually be built. All submarines with the exception of Mališan and the Heroj-class boats were named after rivers in Yugoslavia.

The last class of Yugoslav submarines was the Una-class midget submarines which, unlike their larger predecessor, did not carry any torpedo armament and were designed for covert special operations. A new class of larger submarines armed with torpedoes and anti-ship missiles, dubbed the Lora class or Project B-73, was planned but was not started due to the subsequent Breakup of Yugoslavia. By 1991 the JRM operated eleven submarines homeported in the Lora Naval Base in Split. With the start of the Croatian War of Independence all except one Una class were relocated to Montenegro where they were commissioned with the FR Yugoslav Navy.

Class	Image	Type	Boats	Shipyard	History	Fate
CB class		Midget submarine	Mališan (P-901)	Caproni, Milan	Former Italian CB-20. Captured by Yugoslav Partisans in 1945 and commissioned as Mališan (P-901).	Decommissioned in the early 1950s. Donated to the Technical Museum in Zagreb in 1959.
modified L class		Submarine	Tara (P-801)	Vickers-Armstrongs, Tyne	Former Royal Yugoslav Navy boat.	Stricken in 1954. Deleted in 1958.
Flutto class		Submarine	Sava (P-802)	Cantieri Riuniti dell'Adriatico, Monfalcone, Kingdom of Italy	Former Regia Marina boat. Sunk in 1944. Raised by Yugoslav Forces after the war and commissioned as Sava.	Deleted in 1971.
Sutjeska class		Submarine	Sutjeska (P-811); Neretva (P-812)	Uljanik, Pula, SR Croatia	First domestically built submarine class.	Decommissioned during the 1980s.
Heroj class		Attack submarine	Heroj (P-821); Junak (P-822); Uskok (P-823)	Brodogradilište specijalnih objekata, Split, SR Croatia	Completed during the late 1960s.	Relocated to Montenegro at the start of the war.
Sava class	Link to file	Attack submarine	Sava (P-831); Drava (P-832)	Brodogradilište specijalnih objekata, Split, SR Croatia	Completed during the late 1970s and early 1980s.	Relocated to Montenegro at the start of the war.
Una class		Midget submarine	Tisa (P-911); Una (P-912); Zeta (P-913); Soča (P-914); Kupa (P-915); Vardar (P-915)	Brodogradilište specijalnih objekata, Split, SR Croatia	Completed during the late 1980s. Last generation of Yugoslav submarines.	Soča captured by Croatian Forces and commissioned with the Croatian Navy as Velebit. The rest relocated to Montenegro.

== Destroyers ==
Class	Image	Type	Boats	Shipyard	History	Fate
—		Destroyer	Split (R-11)	Yarrow Shipbuilders, Split	Laid down in 1939 for the Royal Yugoslav Navy. Commissioned 1958	Stricken in 1984. Scrapped in 1986.
W class		Destroyer	Kotor (R-21); Pula (R-22)	John Brown, Clydebank, Scotland	Acquired from the Royal Navy in October 1956.	Kotor sold for breaking up in 1971. Pula stricken the same year, sold for breaking up in 1972.

== Destroyer escorts ==
Class	Image	Type	Boats	Shipyard	History	Fate
Ciclone class		Destroyer escort / torpedo boats	Triglav (RE-51); Biokovo (RE-52)	Navalmeccanica, Naples; CT Riva Trigoso	Former Regia Marina ships transferred to Yugoslavia in 1949 as war reparation.	Decommissioned in 1971.
Ariete class		Destroyer escort / torpedo boat	Durmitor (RE-53); Učka (RE-54)	Ansaldo, Genoa, Kingdom of Italy; Rijeka	Durmitor is a former Regia Marina ship transferred to Yugoslavia in 1949 as war reparation. Učka was damaged while being built at Rijeka. Later rebuilt and completed by Yugoslavia.	Decommissioned in 1971.

== Frigates ==
Class	Image	Type	Boats	Shipyard	History	Fate
Koni class		Frigate	Split (VPBR-31); Koper (VPBR-32)	Zelenodolsk, USSR	Acquired from the USSR; Split in 1980 and Koper in 1982.	Relocated to Montenegro at the start of the war.
Kotor class		Frigate	Kotor (VPBR-33); Pula (VPBR-34)	Tito's Kraljevica Shipyard, SR Croatia	Yugoslav built design based on the Koni class.	Relocated to Montenegro at the start of the war. Both boats decommissioned in 2019.

== Corvette ==
Class	Image	Type	Boats	Shipyard	History	Fate
Flower class		Corvette	Partizanka	Harland and Wolff, Belfast	Transferred to Yugoslavia from the Royal Navy on 11 January 1944. Commissioned under the name Nada. Renamed Partizanka on 17 November 1945.	Returned to Great Britain in 1948/49.

== Fast attack craft ==
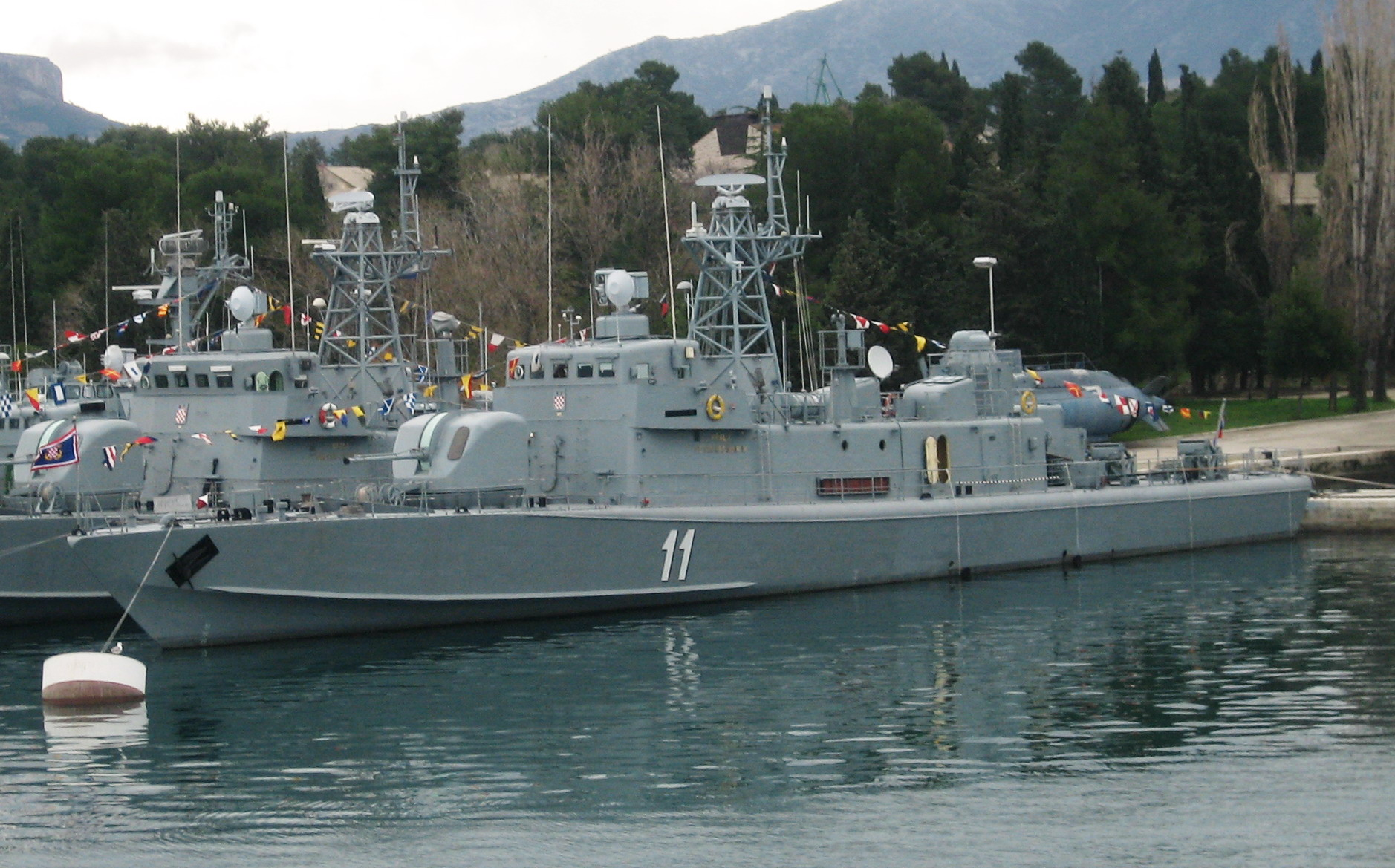
Kralj Petar Krešimir was laid down as Sergej Mašera, the first ship in a new class of missile boats that was to be built for the Yugoslav Navy just before the breakup of Yugoslavia.

The JRM operated a large number of fast attack craft, commissioning both torpedo and missile boats of different origin. One of the first torpedo boats to enter service with the JRM after the war were the eight American MT-class motor torpedo boats, PT boats built by Higgins which received designations from MT1 to MT8. Starting with 1951 up to 1960, Yugoslav shipyards, mainly on the island of Korčula, constructed somewhere between 75 and 96 Higgins torpedo boats, with sources being conflicting regarding the exact number. In the early 1960s a number of them were converted to motor gun boats by removing the torpedo tubes. The last Higgins hulls were deleted by 1979. Improved relations with the Soviet Union from the 1960s made buying eastern military equipment once again possible; acquisition of ten Osa I-class missile boats started in 1965 becoming the first ships of the Yugoslav Navy to be armed with anti-ship missiles. Four Shershen-class torpedo boats were commissioned around the same time with ten additional boats being licence built at the Kraljevica Shipyard.

The 1970s saw the introduction of six Končar-class missile boats featuring a mixture of Soviet and Swedish weaponry. At the time of the escalation of the Croatian War of Independence, the first ship of a new class of missile boats was being built at the Kraljevica Shipyard. Laid down as Sergej Mašera, the unfinished ship was captured by the Croatians, completed and entered service with the Croatian Navy as Kralj Petar Krešimir IV (RTOP-11).

=== Torpedo boats ===
Class	Image	Type	Boats	Shipyard	History	Fate
		Sea-going torpedo boat	Golešnica (91); Cer (92)	Stabilimento Tecnico Triestino, Trieste, Austro-Hungarian Empire	Built for the Austro-Hungarian Navy as Tb 76 and Tb 87.	
Orjen class		Torpedo boat	TČ-391; TČ-392	Lürssen, Nazi Germany	Former Royal Yugoslav Navy Durmitor and Kajmakčalan. Commissioned with the JRM as TČ-5 and TČ-6 and renamed later on.	Both scrapped in 1962/63.
PT boat		Torpedo boat	TČ-121; TČ-129; TČ-174			
Shershen class		Torpedo boat	Pionir (TČ-211); Partizan (TČ-212); Proleter (TČ-213); Topčider (TČ-214); Ivan (TČ-215); Jadran (TČ-216); Kornat (TČ-217); Biokovac (TČ-218); Streljko (TČ-219); Crvena Zvijezda (TČ-220); Borac (TČ-221); Partizan II (TČ-222); Partizan III (TČ-223); Pionir II (TČ-224)	Yaroslavl Shipyard, USSR; Tito's Kraljevica Shipyard, SR Croatia	Pionir, Partizan, Topčider and Ivan acquired from the USSR in 1965. The rest were licence built at the Kraljevica Shipyard from 1968 to 1971.	Partizan II and Streljko were captured by Croatian Forces. Only Partizan II was commissioned with the Croatian Navy while Streljko was sunk as a target on a live fire exercise in 1994. The rest were relocated to Montenegro and deleted during the 1990s.

=== Missile boats ===
Class	Image	Type	Boats	Shipyard	History	Fate
Osa I class		Missile boat	Mitar Acev (RČ-301); Vlado Bagat (RČ-302); Petar Drapšin (RČ-303); Stevo Filipovič (RČ-304); Velimir Škorpik (RČ-305); Nikola Martinovič (RČ-306); Josip Mažar Sosa (RČ-307); Karlo Rojc (RČ-308); Franc Rozman-Stane (RČ-309); Žikica Javonovič-Španac (RČ-310)	Rybinskiy Shipyard, USSR	Acquired from the USSR from 1965 to 1969.	RČ-301 and RČ-310 were captured by Croatian Forces. Only RČ-310 was commissioned with the Croatian Navy. The rest were relocated to Montenegro.
Končar class		Missile boat	Rade Končar (RTOP-401); Vlado Četković (RTOP-402); Ramiz Sadiku (RTOP-403); Hasan Zahirović (RTOP-404); Jordan Nikolov (RTOP-405); Ante Banina (RTOP-406)	Tito's Kraljevica Shipyard, SR Croatia	Domestically built during the 1970s.	Vlado Četković captured by Croatian Forces and commissioned with the Croatian Navy. The rest were relocated to Montenegro.

== Patrol boats ==
Class	Image	Type	Boats	Shipyard	History	Fate
Kraljevica class		Patrol boat / ASW	PBR-501; PBR-502; PBR-503; PBR-504; PBR-505; PBR-506; PBR-507; PBR-508; PBR-509; PBR-510; PBR-511; PBR-512; PBR-513; PBR-514; PBR-515; PBR-516; PBR-517; PBR-518; PBR-519; PBR-520; PBR-521; PBR-522; PBR-523; PBR-524; PBR-525	Tito's Kraljevica Shipyard, SR Croatia	Completed between 1951 and 1957.	PBR-513 through PBR-518 built for Indonesia and delivered in 1958/1959. PBR-522 and PBR-523 sold to Sudan in 1969. PBR-509 sold to Ethiopia in 1975. PBR-502 and PBR-505 sold to Bangladesh in 1975. The remainder were decommissioned by the 1980s.
Mornar class		Patrol boat / ASW	Mornar (PBR-551); Borac (PBR-552)	Tito's Kraljevica Shipyard, SR Croatia	Both completed in 1957.	Both scrapped in 1992.
Fougueux class		Patrol boat / Submarine chaser	Udarnik (PBR-581)	FCM, France	Acquired in 1956 through US offshore funding.	Decommissioned in 1984. Sunk as a target in 1988.
Type 132		Patrol boat	Kalnik (PČ-132); Velebit (PČ-133); Graničar (PČ-134); Triglav (PČ-135); Romanija (PČ-136); Kamenar (PČ-137); PČ-138; PČ-139; Kožuf (PČ-140)	Tito's Kraljevica Shipyard, SR Croatia	Completed between 1964 and 1968. Names from Marinkalender 1990	—
Mirna class		Patrol boat	Biokovo (PČ-171); Pohorje (PČ-172); Koprivnik (PČ-173); Učka (PČ-174); Grmeč (PČ-175); Mukos (PČ-176); Fruška Gora (PČ-177); Kosmaj (PČ-178); Zelengora (PČ-179); Cer (PČ-180); Durmitor (PČ-181)	Tito's Kraljevica Shipyard, SR Croatia	Competed between 1980 and 1985.	Biokovo, Mukos, Cer and Durmitor captured by Croatian Forces and commissioned with the Croatian Navy. The rest were relocated to Montenegro.

== Mine warfare ==
Class	Image	Type	Boats	Shipyard	History	Fate
Malinska class		Mining tender	M-31; M-32; M-33	Kraljevica Shipyard	Former Austro-Hungarian / Royal Yugoslav Navy ships. M31 originally commissioned as M1, M32 as M2, M33 as M3; all three renamed later on.	—
RD1 class		Minesweeper	ML-301; ML-302; ML-303; ML-304; ML-305; ML-306; ML-307	Arsenale di Castellamare di Stabia (ML-301–304); Tosi, Taranto (ML-305–307)	Former Regia Marina ships.	—
Type 101		Inshore minesweeper	M-101; M-102; M-103; M-104; M-106; M-107; M-108; M-109; M-110; M-111; M-112; M-113; M-114; M-115; M-116	Yugoslavia	Completed between 1950 and 1956.	Stricken during the 1960s and 1970s.
Type 117		Inshore minesweeper	M-117; M-118; M-119; M-120; M-121; M-122; M-123	Yugoslavia	Completed between 1964 and 1968.	Stricken during the 1980s.
Sirius class		Minesweeper	Vukov Klanac (M-151); Podgora (M-152); Blitvenica (M-153); Gradac (M-161)	Le Havre, France (M-151–153); Yugoslavia (M-161)		Vukov Klanac captured by Croatian Forces but was destroyed soon after by RSK army artillery fire. The rest relocated to Montenegro.
Ham class		Minesweeper	Maun (M-141); Brseč (M-142); Olib (M-143); Iž (M-144)			Olib and Iž were sunk by Croatian coastal artillery during the Battle of the Dalmatian Channels, November 1991.
Neštin class		Minesweeper	Neštin (M-331); Motajiča (M-332); Belegis (M-333); Bosut (M-334); Vučedol (M-335); Panonsko More (M-337)		Completed between 1975 and 1980.	—

== Landing craft ==
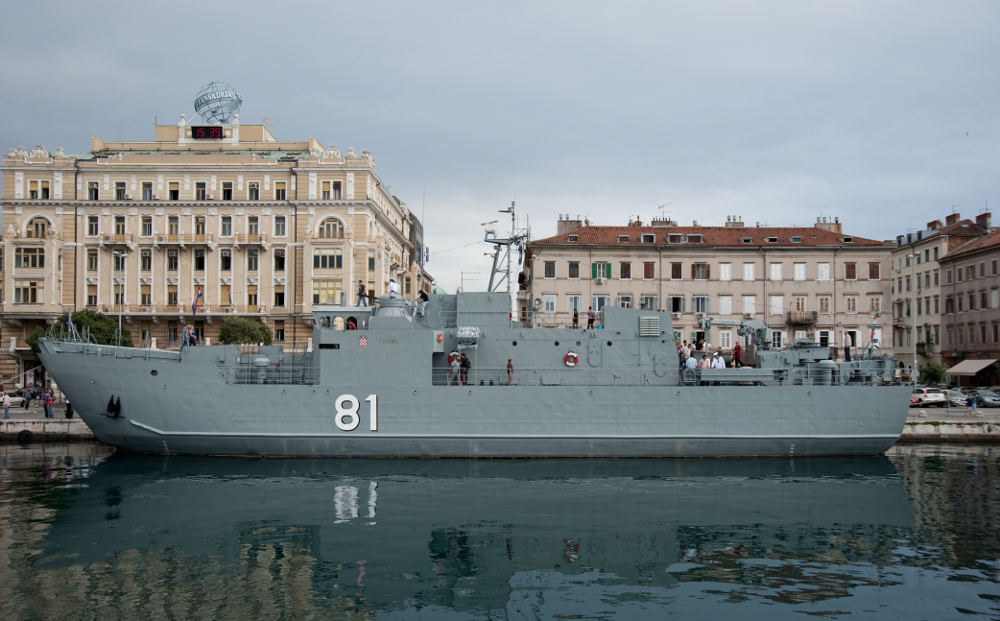
Cetina was laid down as Rab which was to become the second Silba-class ship built for the JRM.

The Yugoslav Partisans captured several landing craft during the last stages of the Second World War. Among them were two former Italian MZ-type craft which were deleted by 1979 and a single ex-German MFP. An unknown number of Siebel ferries was also commissioned. During the 1950s Yugoslav shipyards built a large number of landing craft based on German war designs designating them as DTMs (Desantni Tenkonosac-Minopolagač, tank landing craft-minelayer), DSMs (Desantna Splav-Minopolagač, landing craft-minelayer) and PDSs (Pomoćna Desantna Splav, auxiliary landing craft). Several of these craft were captured by the Croatians, but only PDS-713, DSM-110 and DTM-110 were commissioned with the Croatian Navy, with the fate of the remaining ones left over in Croatian, unknown.

During the 1970s and 1980s the "Montmontaža Greben Shipyard" on the island of Korčula built a large number of Type 11 and Type 22 landing-assault craft intended for transporting troops and cargo. Although sharing a common design, the two types featured a different carrying capacity, propulsion system and weapons. The last class of landing ships to be commissioned with the Yugoslav Navy was the Silba-class landing ship-minelayers. At the start of the Croatian War of Independence one ship was in active service while another one was being built. Named Rab, the unfinished ship was captured by the Croatians, completed and commissioned with the Croatian Navy as Cetina (DBM-81).

Class	Image	Type	Boats	Shipyard	History	Fate
Type 21		Landing assault craft	DJČ-601; DJČ-602; DJČ-603; DJČ-604; DJČ-605; DJČ-606; DJČ-607; DJČ-608; DJČ-609; DJČ-610; DJČ-611; DJČ-612; DJČ-613; DJČ-614; DJČ-615; DJČ-616; DJČ-617; DJČ-618; DJČ-619; DJČ-620	Montmontaža Greben, Vela Luka, SR Croatia	Domestic design completed during the 1970s.	602, 603, 612, 613 and 615 captured by Croatian Forces and commissioned with the Croatian Navy. The rest were relocated to Montenegro
Type 22		Landing assault craft	DJČ-621; DJČ-622; DJČ-623; DJČ-624; DJČ-625; DJČ-626; DJČ-627; DJČ-628; DJČ-629; DJČ-630; DJČ-631; DJČ-632	Montmontaža Greben, Vela Luka, SR Croatia	Completed during the 1980s; improved Type 11 with a larger carrying capacity.	623 and 624 captured by Croatian Forces and commissioned with the Croatian Navy. According to the Naval Institute Guide to Combat Fleets of the World, three additional Type 22 of unknown designations were captured but were not commissioned with the Navy. Conway's All the World's Fighting Ships states that 622 was also captured. The rest were relocated to Montenegro
Silba class		Landing ship-minelayer	Krk (DBM-241)	Brodogradilište specijalnih objekata, Split, SR Croatia	Completed in 1986	Relocated to Montenegro.

== Auxiliaries ==
=== Tugboats ===
Class	Image	Type	Boats	Shipyard	History	Fate
		Harbour tugboat	LR-67; LR-68; LR-69; LR-70; LR-71; LR-72; LR-73; LR-74			LR-71 and LR-73 captured by Croatian forces and commissioned with the Croatian Navy under their existing designations.
		Coastal tugboat	PR-37; Tunj (PR-38); PR-39; PR-40	Tito's Kraljevica Shipyard, Kraljevica, SR Croatia (PR-38 and PR-39)	PR-38 completed in 1957 and PR-39 in 1958.	Relocated to Montenegro
		Coastal tugboat	Orada (PR-41)	Tito's Shipyard Beograd, Belgrade, SR Serbia		Relocated to Montenegro

== See also ==
- List of active Croatian Navy ships
- Montenegrin Navy § Vessels
- Slovenian Navy § Equipment
- List of ships of the Royal Yugoslav Navy
