= List of active Croatian Navy ships =

Naval ensign of Croatia

The Croatian Navy maintains over 30 vessels including five missile boats which, along with three MOL coastal defence batteries, represent its main offensive capability. The latest ships to enter service with the Croatian Navy were two used Helsinki-class missile boats, which were acquired as an offset agreement to the Croatian purchase of Patria AMV vehicles.

Domestic production programs were limited to continuing existing Yugoslav designs and building a single missile boat (Kralj Dmitar Zvonimir) and a small mine hunter (Korčula), both of which took several years to complete.

== Navy combat fleet ==
(status in former operator's navy)
Class	In service	Origin	Picture	Type	Builder	Ship	No.	Comm.	Displacement	Notes
Missile boats (5)
Končar class	1	Yugoslavia		Missile boat	Tito's Kraljevica Shipyard	Šibenik (Vlado Ćetković)	RTOP-21 (RTOP-402)	28 Sep 1991 (Mar 1978)	260 tonnes	Ship captured by Croatian forces during the Battle of Šibenik.
Helsinki class	2	Finland		Fast attack crafts	Wärtsilä Helsinki Shipyard	Vukovar (Oulu)	RTOP-41 (62)	26 Jan 2009 (1 Oct 1985)	300 tonnes	Purchased second-hand in 2008, as a support for the Patria AMV order.
Helsinki class	2	Finland		Fast attack crafts	Wärtsilä Helsinki Shipyard	Dubrovnik (Kotka)	RTOP-41 (63)	26 Jan 2009 (16 Jun 1986)	300 tonnes	Purchased second-hand in 2008, as a support for the Patria AMV order.
Kralj class	2	Croatia		Missile boat	Kraljevica Shipyard	Kralj Petar Krešimir IV (Sergej Mašera when laid down)	RTOP-11	1992	385 tonnes	Captured unfinished by Croatian forces during the Battle of Šibenik.
Kralj class	2	Croatia		Missile boat	Kraljevica Shipyard	Kralj Dmitar Zvonimir	RTOP-12	10 Sep 2001	385 tonnes	Laid down in 1993. This ship features a longer hull and modified bridge
Patrol boats (6)
Mirna class	4	Yugoslavia		Patrol boat	Tito's Kraljevica Shipyard	Novigrad (Biokovo)	OB-01 (PČ-171)	1991 (1980)	142 tonnes	Boats captured during the Battle of Šibenik, except for the Šolta which was refloated and repaired by Croatia after the Battle of the Dalmatian Channels.
Mirna class	4	Yugoslavia		Patrol boat	Tito's Kraljevica Shipyard	Šolta (Mukos)	OB-02 (PČ-176)	1991 (1983)	142 tonnes	Boats captured during the Battle of Šibenik, except for the Šolta which was refloated and repaired by Croatia after the Battle of the Dalmatian Channels.
Mirna class	4	Yugoslavia		Patrol boat	Tito's Kraljevica Shipyard	Cavtat (Cer)	OB-03 (PČ-180)	1991 (1984)	142 tonnes	Boats captured during the Battle of Šibenik, except for the Šolta which was refloated and repaired by Croatia after the Battle of the Dalmatian Channels.
Mirna class	4	Yugoslavia		Patrol boat	Tito's Kraljevica Shipyard	Hrvatska (Durmitor)	OB-04 (PČ-181)	1991 (1985)	142 tonnes	Boats captured during the Battle of Šibenik, except for the Šolta which was refloated and repaired by Croatia after the Battle of the Dalmatian Channels.
Omiš class	2 (+ 3 on order)	Croatia		Patrol boat	Shipyard: Brodosplit; Designer: Marine and Energy Solutions DIV d.o.o. (Zagreb)	Omiš	OB-31	7 Dec 2018	269 tonnes	Prototype boat.
Omiš class	2 (+ 3 on order)	Croatia		Patrol boat	Shipyard: Brodosplit; Designer: Marine and Energy Solutions DIV d.o.o. (Zagreb)	Umag	OB-32	17 Jan 2025	269 tonnes	First of the serial production boats.
Landing crafts (5)
Silba class	2	Croatia		Landing ship (ro-ro) (minelayer as secondary role)	Brodosplit	Cetina	DBM-81	19 Feb 1993	945 tonnes / 540 tonnes	Project initiated under Yugoslavian leadership.
Silba class	2	Croatia		Landing ship (ro-ro) (minelayer as secondary role)	Brodosplit	Krka	DBM-82	9 Mar 1995	945 tonnes / 540 tonnes	Project initiated under Yugoslavian leadership.
Type 21 class	2	Yugoslavia		Landing / assault craft	Montmontaža Greben shipyard	–	DJB-104 (DJC-615)	1991 (1987)	32 tonnes	Boats captured by Croatia.
Type 21 class	2	Yugoslavia		Landing / assault craft	Montmontaža Greben shipyard	–	DJB-107 (DJC-613)	1991 (1988)	32 tonnes	Boats captured by Croatia.
Type 22 class	1	Yugoslavia		Landing / assault craft	Montmontaža Greben shipyard	–	DJB-106 (DJC-624)	1991 (1987)	43 tonnes	
Minehunters (1)
Korčula class	1	Croatia		Coastal minehunter	Montmontaža Greben shipyard	Korčula	LM-51	22 Apr 2006	180 tonnes	

== Auxiliary fleet ==
(status in former operator's navy)
Class	In service	Origin	Picture	Type	Builder	Ship	No.	Comm.	Displacement	Notes
Auxiliary vessels (2)
Meduza-class	1	Yugoslavia		Transport vessel	Brodotrogir	Meduza (–)	PT-71 (–)	1991 (1956)	350 tonnes	Boat captured during the Battle of Šibenik.
–	1	Yugoslavia	–	Auxiliary landing craft	Uljanik shipyard (Pula)	–	PDS-713 (–)	Sep 1991 (1956)	159 tonnes	
Rescue vessels (1)
Spasilac class	1	Yugoslavia		Rescue ship	Tito's Kraljevica Shipyard	Faust Vrančić (Spasilac)	BS-73 (PS-12)	Nov 1995 (1976)	1590 tonnes	
Tugboats (2)
–	2	Yugoslavia		Harbour tugboat	Brodosplit	–	LR-71	1991 (1960)	130 tonnes	
–	2	Yugoslavia		Harbour tugboat	Brodosplit	–	LR-73	1991 (1960)	130 tonnes	
Training vessels (1)
Moma class	1	Poland		Training ship	Gdańsk Shipyard	Andrija Mohorovičić (Moma)	BŠ-72 (PH-33)	Jan 1994 (1972)	1,260 tonnes	Boat captured during the Battle of Šibenik, commissioned after conversion in 1994.
Elan 431	1	Slovenia	–	Motor sailboat (training)	Elan Yachts	Zrinka	–	1994	12 tonnes	
Salona 37	1	Croatia		Motor sailboat (training)	AD Brodovi	Katarina Zrinski	HRM-1	2004	–	
Salona 45	1	Croatia		Motor sailboat (training)	AD Brodovi	Kraljica Jelena	HRM-2	2008	–	

== Future of the Croatian Navy ==
=== Planned procurement ===
Corvettes (2 vessels)
Croatia launched a competition for the purchase of 2 corvettes. The budget goes from €660 million to €1.6 billion. Depending on the capabilities selected, the budget will be adapted. The first delivery is planned for 2029 or 2030.
The competitors include:
- European competitors:
  - Croatia: Brodosplit BIS-91-class corvette
  - France: Naval Group Gowind-class corvette
  - Germany:
    - K130-class corvette
    - NVL MMPV 90-clas corvette
  - Italy: Fincantieri FcX30-class corvette
  - Netherlands: Damen Sigma-class corvette
  - Spain Navantia Avante 2200-class corvette
  - Sweden: unspecified class from Saab AB
  - Turkey:
    - Ada-class corvette
    - ASFAT Hisar-class corvette
    - Dearsan C92-class corvette
  - United Kingdom: Babcock Arrowhead 120-light frigate class
  - Multinational: EPC-class corvette
- Extra-European competitors:
  - Israel: Reshef-class corvette
  - South Korea: unspecified class from unspecified shipyard
  - United States: LCS-class corvette

== See also ==
- List of ships of the Yugoslav Navy
- Navy of the Independent State of Croatia
- List of ships of the Royal Yugoslav Navy
- Austro-Hungarian Navy
