= Končar-class missile boat =

Class of missile boats built for Yugoslav navy

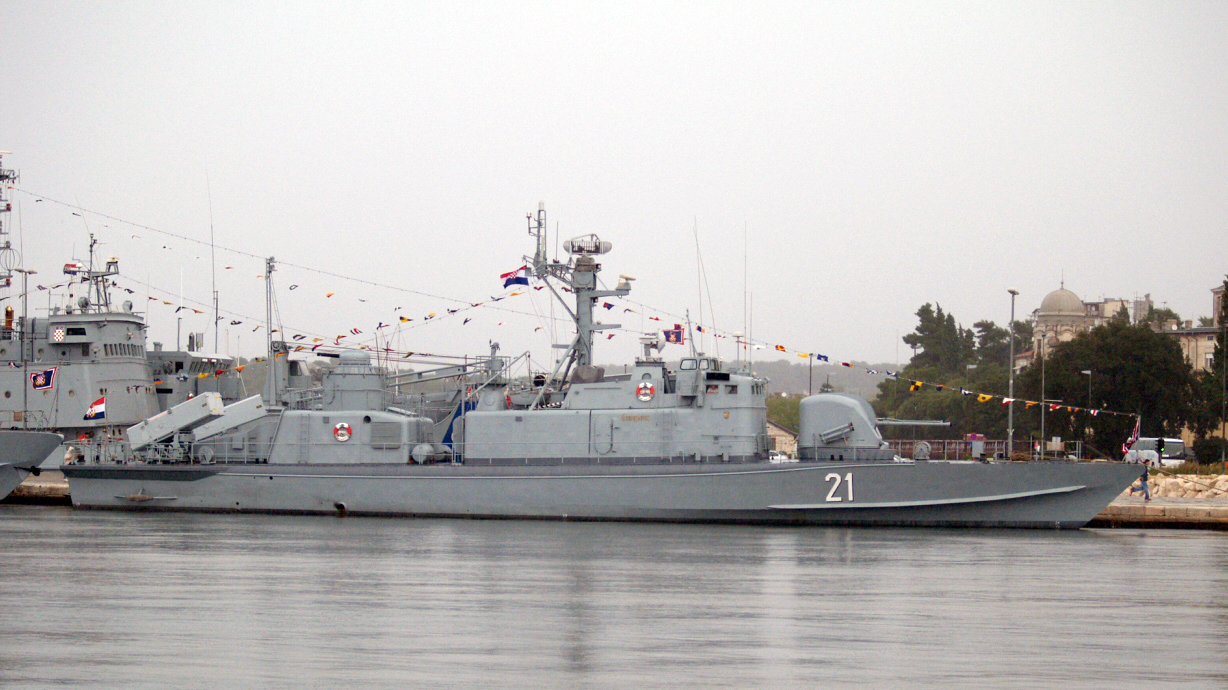
- Šibenik (RTOP-21) of the Croatian Navy. Note that unlike other Končar-class ships, Šibenik is armed with two RBS-15.

Class overview
- Builders: Tito's Shipyard Kraljevica, Kraljevica, Yugoslavia
- Operators: Yugoslav Navy; War Navy of Serbia and Montenegro; Croatian Navy; Montenegrin Navy
- Succeeded by: Kralj class
- In commission: 1977–present
- Completed: 6
- Active: 3
- Laid up: 3

General characteristics (as completed)
- Type: Missile boat
- Displacement: Full: 271 t (267 long tons)
- Length: 44.9 m (147 ft 4 in)
- Beam: 8.4 m (27 ft 7 in)
- Draft: 2.6 m (8 ft 6 in)
- Propulsion: Four shafts; CODAG; 2 × RR Marine gas turbines; 2 × MTU diesel engine
- Speed: Maximum: 38–40 knots (70–74 km/h; 44–46 mph); Cruising: 22 knots (41 km/h; 25 mph)
- Endurance: 5 to 7 days
- Complement: 30
- Armament: 2 × SS-N-2 Styx anti-ship missiles; 2 × Bofors 57 mm (2.2 in)/70 Mk1 gun

The Končar class is a class of six missile boats built for the Yugoslav Navy during the late 1970s at Tito's Shipyard Kraljevica, SR Croatia. The boats featured a mixture of Western and Eastern European equipment, including Soviet anti-ship missiles and Swedish guns.

During the Croatian War of Independence one ship, Vlado Ćetković, was captured by Croatian forces while being overhauled. It was eventually commissioned with the Croatian Navy as Šibenik and is still in use. The remaining five ships were relocated to Montenegro, entering service with the new FR Yugoslav Navy, with three of them being decommissioned in the early 2000s. The last two ships of the class are planned to be modified as patrol boats for service with the Montenegrin Navy.

== Description ==
The Končar class was developed by the Brodarski institut (BI) from Zagreb. The six-strong class was built at the Tito's Kraljevica Shipyard from 1977 to 1979 with all six ships being named after People's Heroes of Yugoslavia. The ships measure 44.9 m (147 ft 4 in) in length, with a 8.4 m (27 ft 7 in) beam and 2.6 m (8 ft 6 in) draught. The hull, similar to the Swedish Spica class, is made of steel with an aluminium superstructure. Fully loaded they displace 271 t (267 long tons) and are manned by a crew of 30.

The class utilizes a CODAG engine configuration for propulsion. Mounted on four shafts, two MTU 16V 538 TB91 diesel engines are used for economical cruising while two RR Marine Proteus 52 M gas turbines are used for achieving high speeds. Cruising speed is 22 knots (41 km/h; 25 mph) while the maximum achievable speed is 38–40 knots (70–74 km/h; 44–46 mph). Travelling at a near maximum speed of 38 knots, the ships have a maximum range of 380–490 nautical miles (700–910 km; 440–560 mi). Powered by diesel engines only and travelling at a speed of 22–23 knots (41–43 km/h; 25–26 mph) they have a range of 780–870 nautical miles (1,440–1,610 km; 900–1,000 mi), with exact numbers varying from source to source. Endurance is between five and seven days.

Gun armament of the class consists of two Bofors 57 mm (2.2 in)/70 Mk1 gun mounted on the bow and towards the stern. During the development phase, the designers planned on using French Exocet anti-ship missiles as the class's main weapon system. However, due to the high price the French asked for the missile, possibly because of political reasons, the project was changed and two Soviet P-20 (SS-N-2B) were used instead. Self-defense measures include two Wallop Barricade chaff launchers.

== Ships ==
Name	Pennant number	Namesake	Builder	Launched	Commissioned	Fate
Rade Končar	RTOP-401	Rade Končar	Tito's Shipyard Kraljevica, Kraljevica, SR Croatia, SFR Yugoslavia	16 October 1976	April 1977	Withdrawn from service. Docked at Bar with weapons removed.
Vlado Ćetković	RTOP-402	Vlado Ćetković	Tito's Shipyard Kraljevica, Kraljevica, SR Croatia, SFR Yugoslavia	20 August 1977	March 1978	In service with the Croatian Navy as RTOP-21 Šibenik
Ramiz Sadiku	RTOP-403	Ramiz Sadiku	Tito's Shipyard Kraljevica, Kraljevica, SR Croatia, SFR Yugoslavia	24 April 1978	September 1978	scrapped
Hasan Zahirović-Laca	RTOP-404	Hasan Zahirović-Laca	Tito's Shipyard Kraljevica, Kraljevica, SR Croatia, SFR Yugoslavia	9 November 1978	December 1978	decommissioned; on dead berth in Bar
Jordan Nikolov Orce	RTOP-405	Jordan Nikolov Orce	Tito's Shipyard Kraljevica, Kraljevica, SR Croatia, SFR Yugoslavia	26 April 1979	August 1979	In service with the Montenegrin Navy as P-105 Durmitor
Ante Banina	RTOP-406	Ante Banina	Tito's Shipyard Kraljevica, Kraljevica, SR Croatia, SFR Yugoslavia	23 November 1979	November 1980	In service with the Montenegrin Navy. Awaiting conversion to patrol boat

== Service ==
=== Yugoslav Navy service ===
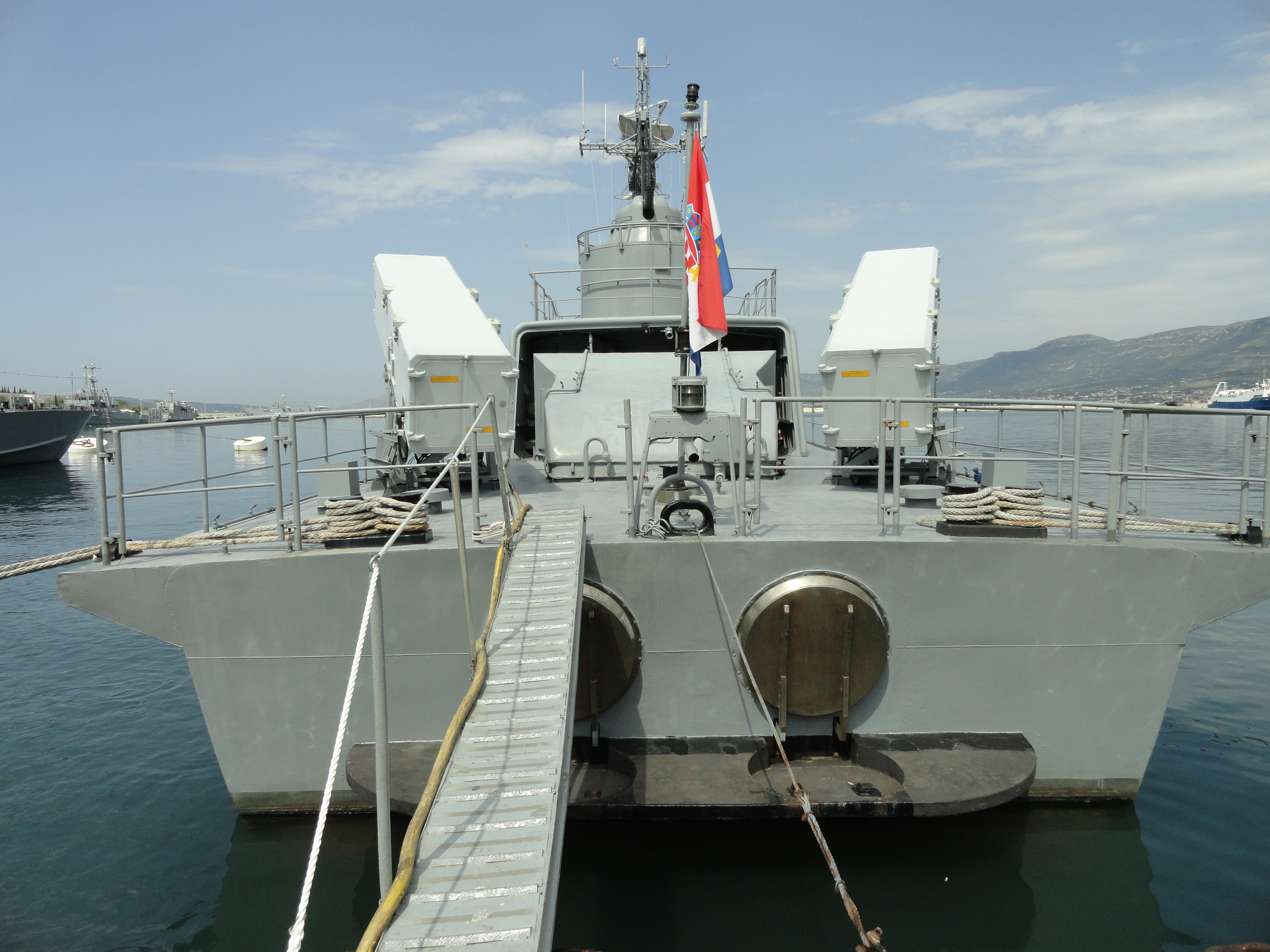
Aft section of Šibenik. Two RBS-15 launchers and the AK-630 CIWS are visible.

During the late 1980s and early 1990s Rade Končar and Vlado Ćetković underwent a modernization program which included removing the stern 57 mm Bofors and installing a Soviet AK-630 CIWS. At the start of the Croatian War of Independence, Vlado Ćetković was captured by Croatian forces in Šibenik while being overhauled. It was commissioned with the Croatian Navy on 28 September 1991 as Šibenik (RTOP-21). Sometime between 1991 and 1994 Šibenik underwent a refit that included removing the P-20 launchers and installing two mounts for up to four Swedish built RBS-15 anti-ship missiles. As of 2022 Šibenik is in active service with the Croatian Navy.

The rest of the class remained in hands of the Yugoslav Navy. On 6 October, Hasan Zahirović-Laca along with the Koni-class frigate Koper (VPBR-32) took part in the Battle of Zadar. Croatian coastal batteries in the area operated two captured Bofors 40 mm (1.6 in) guns with only one of them being in position to open fire on the ships. The initial five to six rounds fired at Hasan Zahirović-Laca missed their target, after which the gun malfunctioned. After a quick repair, the missile boat was targeted again, with three rounds hitting the stern section and causing no damage because the gun crew didn't have armor-piercing ammunition at their disposal. Two Končar-class missile boats also took part in the Battle of the Dalmatian Channels. Jordan Nikolov-Orce, operating under the codename "Parak", and Ante Banina, under the codename "Pakra", were members of the tactical group "Vis" which was tasked with enforcing a naval blockade of the city of Split and the surrounding islands. With the Yugoslav People's Army endings its campaign in Croatia, all ships of the class, excluding Vlado Ćetković, were relocated to Montenegro where they were commissioned with the new FR Yugoslav Navy of Serbia and Montenegro.

Three boats of the class took part in the Lido II incident.

During the Kosovo War the boats, along with the rest of the navy, did not sail out to attack the NATO ships engaged in the campaign because of the huge disparity of forces and the threat from NATO aviation. They were under orders to launch a missile attack if favorable conditions presented themselves, but they never did, since the NATO ships never approached the Yugoslav shores much closer than the maximum range of the boats' missiles. The boats took self-preservation measures such as camouflage, changing berths often and hiding in the submarine pens in the Bay of Kotor, to make it more difficult for the NATO aviation to target them (which, ultimately, it never did). They also contributed to air defense with their weaponry on several occasions with RTOP-405 shooting down a UAV near Risan on 1 June 1999 with her Bofors gun.

=== Post-war service ===
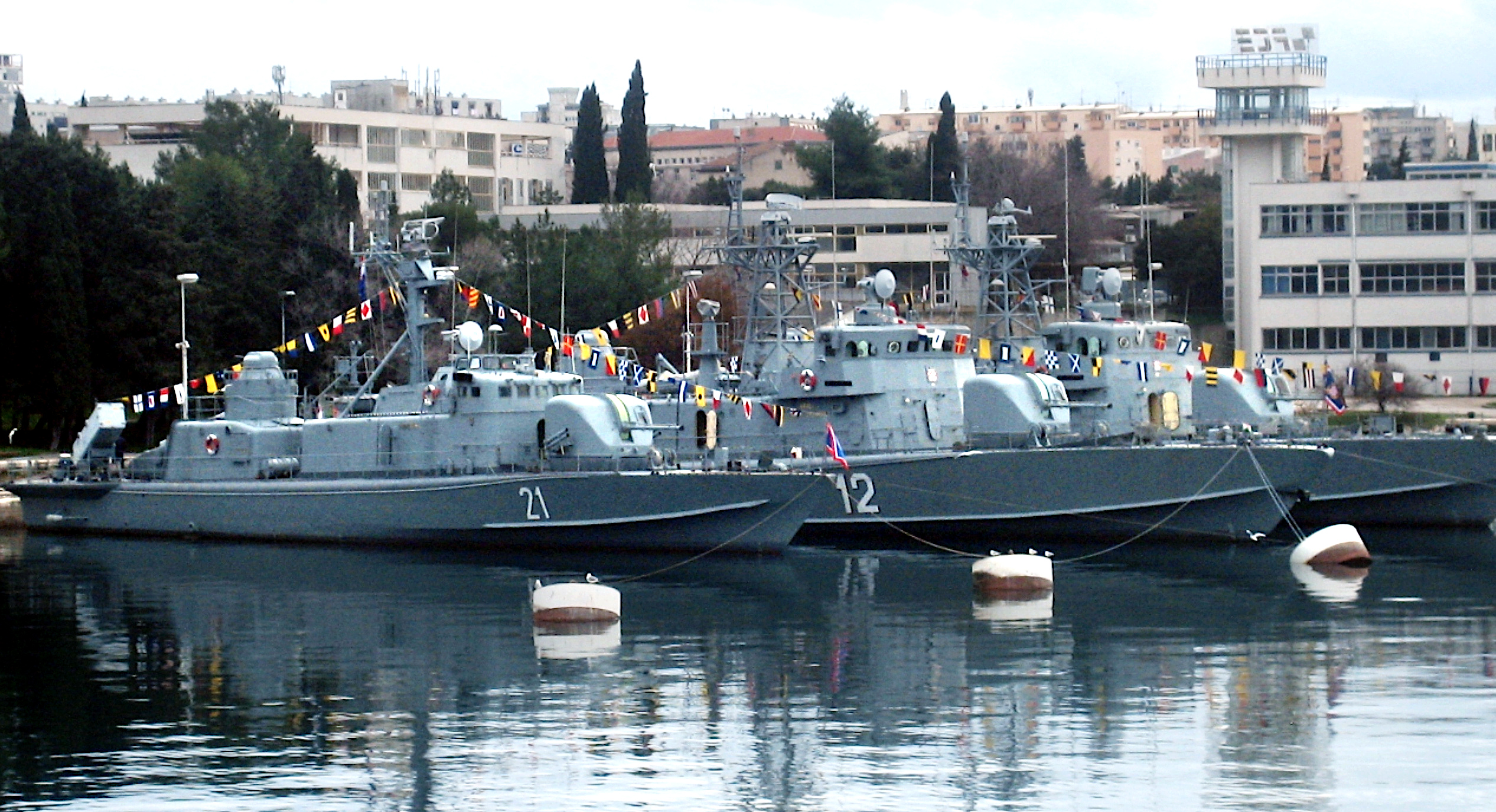
Šibenik (left) photographed in the Lora Naval Base alongside two Kralj-class missile boats, Kralj Dmitar Zvonimir (center) and Kralj Petar Krešimir IV (right)

During the mid 1990s, Ramiz Sadiku was docked for a major overhaul and reconstruction. However, due to the lack of funds the work was never completed and the boat was decommissioned and eventually sold for scrap. The boat's superstructure, propulsion, sensors and weapon systems were dismantled, after which the new owner moved the boat to an underground naval dock on the Luštica peninsula. The boat remained there for several years, before its deteriorating condition caused it to sink inside the dock. The wreck was raised in 2014 and towed to Zelenika where it was broken up to smaller segments which were then transported to the Nikšić steel factory.

In June 2006, Hasan Zahirović-Laca sailed from Boka Kotorska to Italy to participate in the international naval exercise "Adrion Livex 06". The boat left port under the flag of the Navy of Serbia and Montenegro, but because Montenegro declared its independence on 6 June while the boat was still out on exercise, Hasan Zahirović-Laca became the first ship outside of Montenegrin waters to display the flag of the new country. The boat was decommissioned later that year, along with the first boat of the class, Rade Končar. The latter was sold to Kenya in 2014 for an undisclosed price. The Kenyan Navy plans on stripping the boat of its guns and fire-control systems which would then be overhauled and installed on the offshore patrol vessel KNS Jasiri. Rade Končar itself is then expected to be rebuilt and used by the Navy as a patrol boat. The fate of Hasan Zahirović-Laca remains unknown.

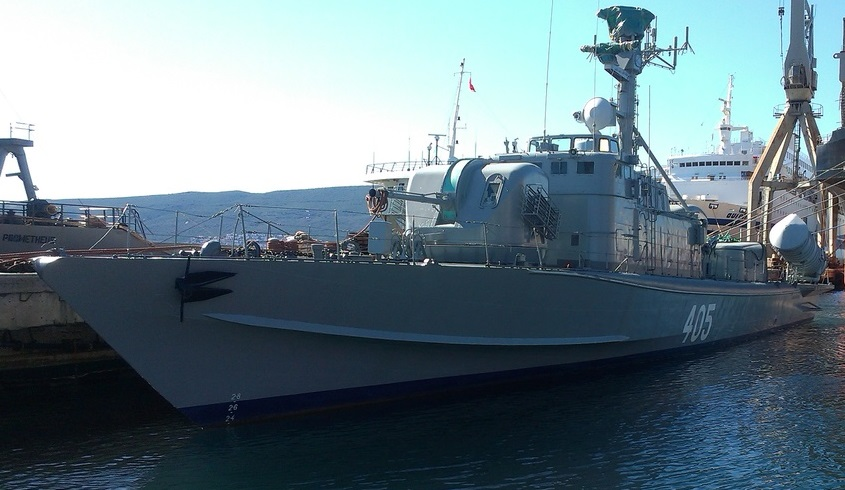
RTOP-405 in service with the Montenegrin Navy photographed in 2015.

In 2013, the Ministry of Defense of Montenegro issued the Strategic Overview of the Defense of Montenegro (Strategijski pregled odbrane Crne Gore) in which it was stated that until sufficient funds to acquire new patrol boats were made available, the Montenegrin Navy would modify two Končar-class missile boats, RTOP-405 and RTOP-406, for use as patrol boats. In February 2014 it was revealed that the Montenegrin Ministry of Defense chose the Brodarski institut from Zagreb to create the project documentation for the modification of the missile boats. As planned, the boats would be stripped of their missile launchers and the aft Bofors gun to allow a rigid-hulled inflatable boat to be carried. RTOP-405 has been converted to patrol boat and renamed P-105 Durmitor. Conversion of RTOP-406 to patrol boat standard is yet to commence.

== See also ==
- List of ships of the Yugoslav Navy
- List of active Croatian Navy ships
