= Croatian missile boat Šibenik =

1977 Končar-class missile boat

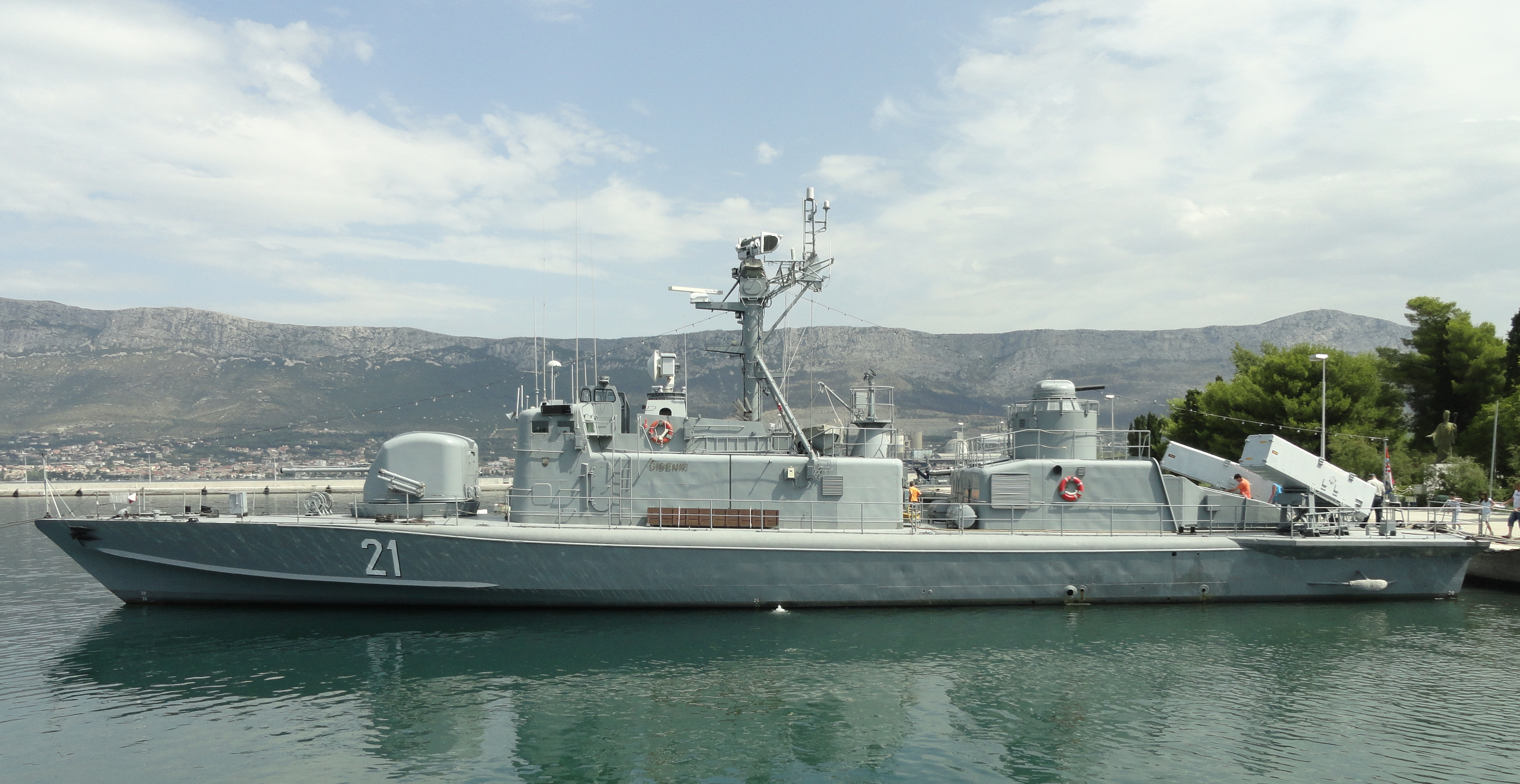
- Šibenik in the Lora Naval Base, August 2011

History

Yugoslavia
- Name: Vlado Ćetković
- Builder: Tito's Kraljevica Shipyard, Kraljevica, Croatia, Yugoslavia
- Launched: 20 August 1977
- Commissioned: March 1978
- Identification: RTOP-402

Croatia
- Name: Šibenik
- Acquired: 1991
- Commissioned: 28 September 1991
- Home port: Lora Naval Base, Split, Croatia
- Identification: RTOP-21

General characteristics
- Class & type: Končar-class missile boat
- Displacement: Standard: 237 tonnes (233 long tons); Full: 260 tonnes (260 long tons)
- Length: 44.9 m (147 ft 4 in)
- Beam: 8.4 m (27 ft 7 in)
- Draft: 2.6 m (8 ft 6 in)
- Propulsion: CODAG; 2 × MTU diesel engines; 2 × Rolls-Royce Marine Proteus gas turbines
- Speed: Maximum: 40 knots (74 km/h; 46 mph); Cruising: 22 knots (41 km/h; 25 mph)
- Endurance: 5–7 days
- Complement: 30
- Armament: 2–4 × RBS-15 anti-ship missiles; 1 × Bofors 57 mm (2.2 in) D70 gun; 1 × AK-630 CIWS

Šibenik (pennant number RTOP-21) is a Končar-class missile boat in service with the Croatian Navy. It was built for the Yugoslav Navy at the Kraljevica Shipyard in the 1970s as Vlado Ćetković (RTOP-402). In 1991 during the early stages of the Croatian War of Independence it was captured by Croatian forces while being overhauled at the "Velimir Škorpik" shipyard in Šibenik.

== Design and construction ==
Šibenik was launched as Vlado Ćetković (RTOP-402) on 20 August 1977 as the second ship in a class of six missile boats that were being built at the Tito's Kraljevica Shipyard for the Yugoslav Navy (Jugoslavenska ratna mornarica – JRM). It was commissioned with the JRM in March 1978. The ship measures 44.9 m (147 ft 4 in) in length, with a 8.4 m (27 ft 7 in) beam and 2.6 m (8 ft 6 in) draught. Propulsion utilizes a CODAG arrangement with two MTU 16V 538 TB91 diesel engines used for economical cruising whilst two RR Marine Proteus 52 M gas turbines are used for achieving higher speeds. Cruising speed is 22 knots (41 km/h; 25 mph) while the maximum achievable speed is 38–40 knots (70–74 km/h; 44–46 mph). Travelling at a near maximum speed of 38 knots, the ship has a maximum range of 380–490 nautical miles (700–910 km; 440–560 mi). Powered by diesel engines only and travelling at a speed of 22–23 knots (41–43 km/h; 25–26 mph) Šibenik has a range of 780–870 nautical miles (1,440–1,610 km; 900–1,000 mi), with exact numbers varying from source to source. Endurance is between five and seven days.

Due to changes carried out during its service, Šibenik features different armament than other ships of its class.

== Service history ==
Just before the Breakup of Yugoslavia, Vlado Ćetković and Rade Končar (RTOP-401) were modified by removing the 57 mm Mk.1 Bofors on their sterns and installing a Soviet made AK-630 CIWS. As the war started gaining momentum, shipyard workers and the Croatian forces managed to protect the ship from the retreating Yugoslav Navy ships and personnel. On September 28, 1991 the former RTOP-402 was commissioned with the newly formed Croatian Navy as RTOP-21 Šibenik with Robert Hranj in command.

During 1993-1994 Šibenik underwent a second weapons configuration change that removed the two P-20 missiles as its main armament, installing new RBS-15s that were acquired by the Yugoslav Navy just before the start of the war, enabling it to carry two or four missile. On October 12, 1994 Šibenik along with RTOP-11 Kralj Petar Krešimir IV. took part in the live fire exercise "Posejdon '94". Šibenik, now under the command of Predrag Stipanović, fired a single missile successfully destroying a decommissioned landing craft.

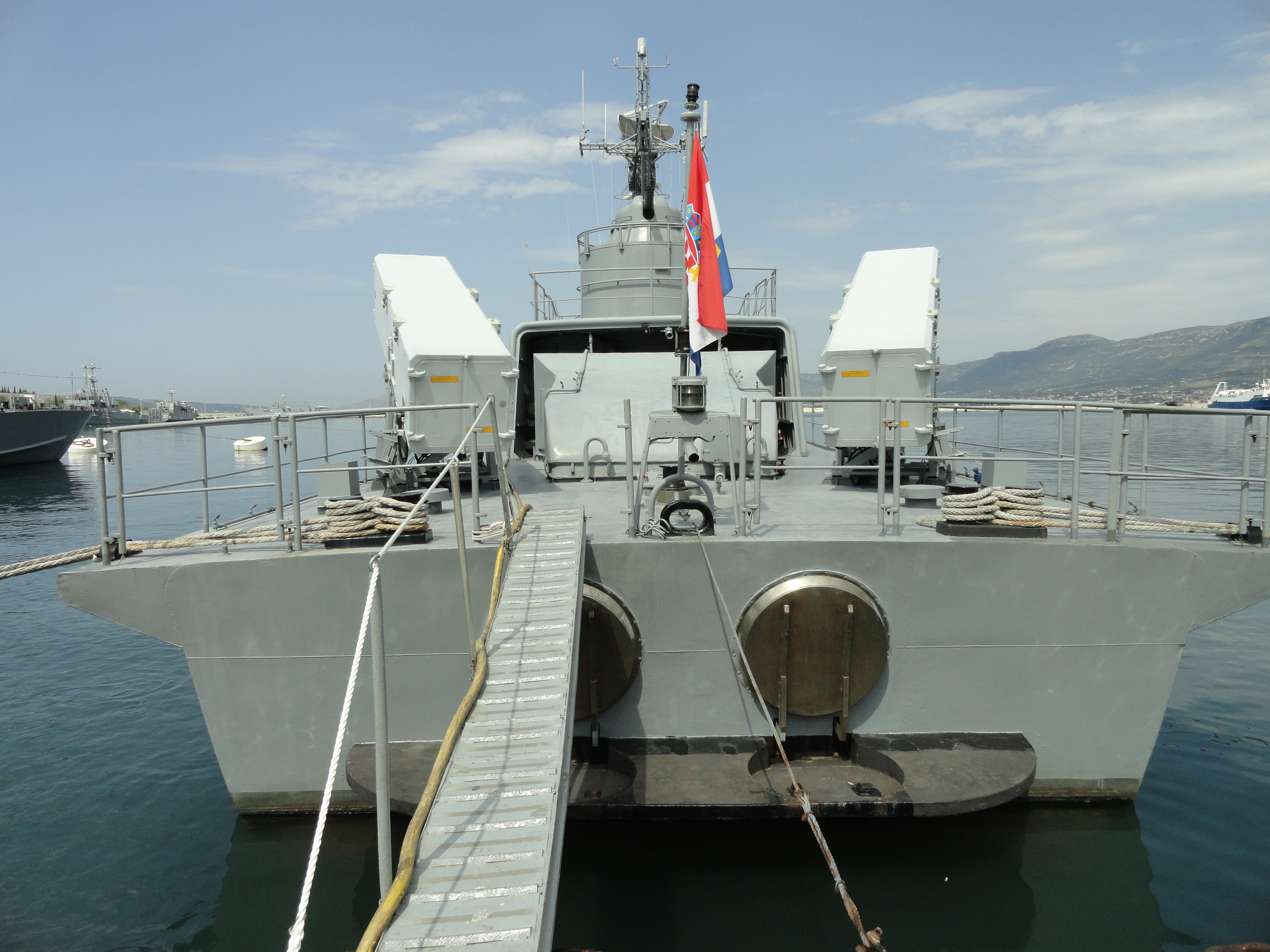
Ship's stern showing two RBS-15 launchers and the AK-630 CIWS.

== See also ==
- List of active Croatian Navy ships
- List of ships of the Yugoslav Navy

== Literature ==
- Wertheim, Eric (2007). The Naval Institute Guide to Combat Fleets of the World: Their Ships, Aircraft, and Systems. Annapolis, Maryland: Naval Institute Press. ISBN 978-1-59114-955-2.
