= Mornar (disambiguation) =

Mornar is a South Slavic occupational surname literally meaning "mariner" or "sailor."

Mornar may also refer to:

- FK Mornar
- KK Mornar Bar
- RK Mornar Bar
- VK Mornar
- Ragbi Klub Mornar Bar
- Mornar-class patrol boat
