= Meleda =

Meleda may refer to:

- Meleda (island), the Italian name of the Adriatic island of Mljet in Croatia
- Meleda disease, a skin disorder
- Meleda, Vologda Oblast, a village in Russia
- Meleda, the Italian name of one the Malinska-class minelayers
