= Kralj-class missile boat =

Class of two missile boats

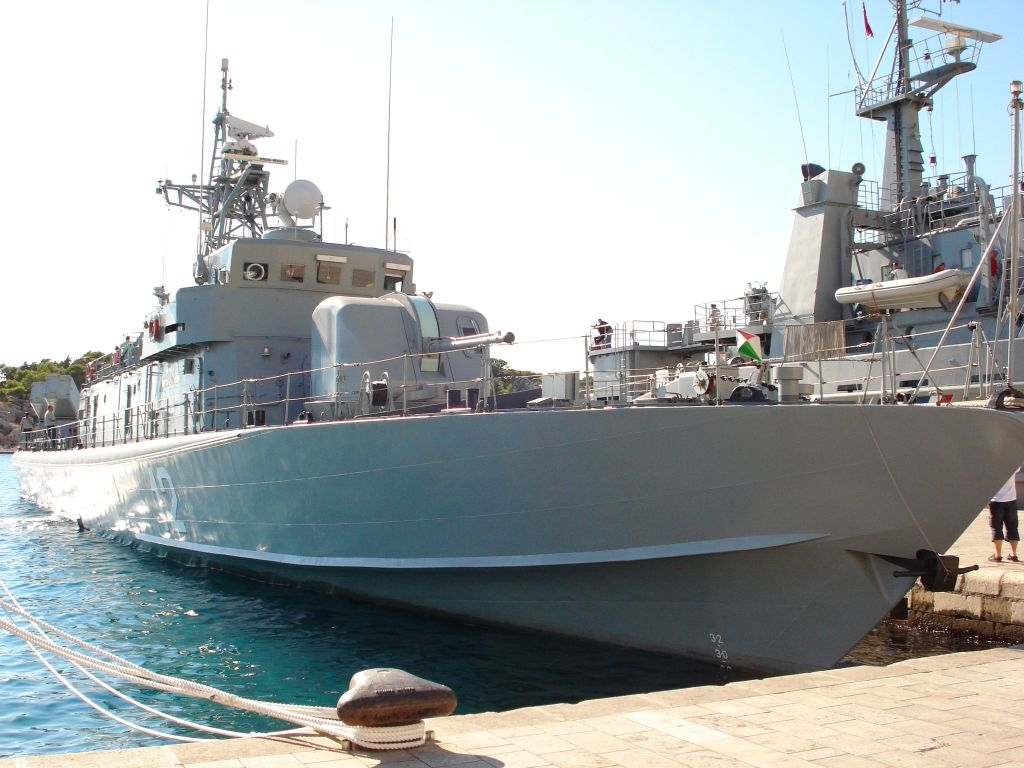
- Kralj Dmitar Zvonimir (RTOP-12) photographed in Makarska in 2008 during the Croatian Navy Day

Class overview
- Builders: Kraljevica Shipyard, Kraljevica, Croatia
- Operators: Croatian Navy
- Preceded by: Končar class
- In commission: 1992–present
- Completed: 2
- Active: 2

General characteristics
- Displacement: 390 tons (full load)
- Length: 177 ft 8 in (54.15 m)
- Draft: 11 ft 8 in (3.56 m)
- Propulsion: Three shafts; 3 × M504-B2 diesel engines
- Speed: Maximum: 36 knots (67 km/h; 41 mph); Continuous: 32.8 knots (60.7 km/h; 37.7 mph)
- Range: 1,700 nautical miles (3,100 km) at 18 knots (33 km/h)
- Complement: 5 officers, 27 enlisted
- Armament: 4–8 × RBS-15 anti-ship missile; 1 × Bofors 57 mm (2.2 in) D70 gun; 1 × AK-630 CIWS

The Kralj class (English: King) is a class of two missile boats, one of which was on order for the SFR Yugoslav Navy and one of which, following the break-up of Yugoslavia, was built for the Croatian Navy. As of 2009 both vessels remain in service. It is an upgraded version of the Rade Končar missile boat class and is 8.5 metres (28 ft) longer. Kralj Petar Krešimir IV and its sister ship Kralj Dmitar Zvonimir are the only ships in their class. A potential third ship was under consideration in 1999, but the ship was never commissioned due to budget restraints.

Kralj means "king" in Croatian - both vessels are named after historic kings of Croatia.

== Development and building ==
The Kralj class was developed by the Brodarski institut (BI) from Zagreb for the Yugoslav Navy as a successor to the Končar-class missile boats. The project was started during the 1980s but was reported as suspended in 1989 only to be restarted again in 1991. The first ship in the new class was to have a pennant number RTOP-501 and named Sergej Mašera after Sergej Mašera, an officer of the Royal Yugoslav Navy who died preventing the destroyer Zagreb from falling in Italian hands during the Axis invasion of Yugoslavia. The new class was also referred to as the Kobra class or Type 400 in some sources.

Compared to the earlier Končar class, the new class was to have a longer hull and an all-diesel propulsion unlike the Končars which were equipped with a CODAG type of propulsion. The new class was also to be the first in Yugoslav service to be equipped with Swedish RBS-15 anti-ship missiles which were acquired in 1988 and 1989. At the start of the Croatian War of Independence, the first ship in the class was nearing completion at the Kraljevica Shipyard. The unfinished ship was captured by Croatian forces and was subsequently commissioned with the Croatian Navy as Kralj Petar Krešimir IV. (RTOP-11). A second, slightly modified ship was laid down by Croatia during the 1990s and commissioned in the early 2000s as Kralj Dmitar Zvonimir (RTOP-12).

== Description ==
There are slight differences between the two ships of the class; Kralj Dmitar Zvonimir, which was completed during the early 2000s, has a longer hull and features a slightly redesigned bridge. Kralj Petar Krešimir IV measures 53.63 m (175 ft 11 in) with a 8.54 m (28 ft 0 in) beam and a 2.94 m (9 ft 8 in) draft.

== Ships ==
Name	Pennant number	Namesake	Builder	Launched	Commissioned	Fate
Kralj Petar Krešimir IV	RTOP-11	Peter Krešimir IV	Kraljevica Shipyard, Kraljevica, Croatia	21 March 1992	7 June 1992	in active service with the Croatian Navy
Kralj Dmitar Zvonimir	RTOP-12	Demetrius Zvonimir	Kraljevica Shipyard, Kraljevica, Croatia	30 March 2001	June 2002	in active service with the Croatian Navy

== Books ==
- Gardiner, Robert (1995). Conway's All the World's Fighting Ships 1947–1995. Naval Institute Press. ISBN 978-0-85177-605-7.

== News reports ==
- Krnić, Denis (29 November 2011). "Slobodna doznaje: Rakete HRM-a vrijedne 50 milijuna dolara spremne za - otpad!" [Slobodna finds out: Croatian Navy missiles worth 50 million dollars are ready - for scrapping]. Slobodna Dalmacija (in Croatian).

== Other sources ==
- "Flotila HRM" [Navy Flotilla]. Armed Forces of the Republic of Croatia.
- "Shipyard Kraljevica – List of delivered vessels 1946. – 2007" (PDF). Kraljevica Shipyard. Archived from the original (PDF) on 9 May 2009.
- Jelavić, Tino (December 2003). "Razmatranja o JNA" [Contemplations regarding the JNA]. Polemos. VI (11–12). Croatian Sociological Association: 163–175.
