= Končar =

Končar, also spelled Konchar, may refer to:

- Mark Koncar (born 1953), American football player
- Rade Končar (1911–1942), World War II Yugoslav Communist resistance fighter
- John Konchar (born 1996), American professional basketball player
- KONČAR Group, an electrical engineering company of Croatia
- Končar-class missile boat, a class of military ship built for the Yugoslav Navy in the 1970s
