= Albona-class minelayer =

Class of Italian and Yugoslav mine warfare ships

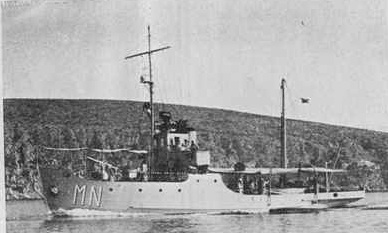
- Malinska photographed in 1939

Class overview
- Builders: Jadranska Brodogradilišta, Kraljevica, Kingdom of Serbs, Croats and Slovenes/Kingdom of Yugoslavia
- Operators: Regia Marina; Royal Yugoslav Navy; Kriegsmarine; National Republican Navy; Yugoslav Navy
- Built: 1920–1931
- In commission: 1920–1963
- Planned: 14
- Completed: 8
- Canceled: 6
- Lost: 5
- Retired: 3

General characteristics
- Displacement: 128–145 t (126–143 long tons) (full load)
- Length: 31.8 m (104 ft) (oa)
- Beam: 6.52 m (21.4 ft)
- Draught: 1.4–1.7 m (4 ft 7 in – 5 ft 7 in)
- Installed power: 1 × Yarrow boiler; 280 ihp (210 kW)
- Propulsion: 2 shafts; 2 × triple-expansion steam engines
- Speed: 9–11 kn (17–20 km/h; 10–13 mph)
- Complement: 29
- Armament: 2 × Model 1915 76 mm (3 in) L/30 guns or; 1 × 66 mm (2.6 in) L/30 gun

The Albona class were mine warfare ships used by the Italian Regia Marina (Royal Navy) and Royal Yugoslav Navy (Serbo-Croatian Latin: Kraljevska mornarica; KM). Fourteen ships were originally laid down between 1917 and 1918 for the Austro-Hungarian Navy as the MT.130 class. However, the end of World War I and the dissolution of Austria-Hungary left them incomplete until 1920, when three ships were finished for the Regia Marina. These ships were armed with two 76 mm (3 in) guns. An additional five ships were completed for the KM in 1931 as the Malinska or Marjan class, and were armed with a single 66 mm (2.6 in) gun. All of the completed ships could carry 24 to 39 naval mines. The remaining ships were never completed.

The five ships in KM service were captured by Italian forces during the Axis invasion of Yugoslavia and commissioned in the Regia Marina as the Arbe class, and were re-armed with two 76 mm guns. They were involved in some operations against the Yugoslav Partisans along the Dalmatian coast. Following the Italian surrender in September 1943, the three Albona-class ships were captured by German forces with all three being lost or scuttled later in the war. Of the five former KM ships, one was seized and operated by the Kriegsmarine (German Navy) until it was lost. Another was captured but transferred to the navy of the German puppet Italian Social Republic, and scuttled by the Germans towards the end of the war. The remaining three were returned to the KM-in-exile at Malta in late 1943 and swept for mines around Malta until transferred to the new Yugoslav Navy (Serbo-Croatian Latin: Jugoslavenska ratna mornarica; JRM) in August 1945.

After the war, the three ships were commissioned into the JRM and their designations were changed several times. In October 1946, two of them were involved in the Corfu Channel incident, an early clash in the developing Cold War, when they laid mines in the Straits of Corfu at the request of the People's Socialist Republic of Albania. The undeclared minefield damaged two British destroyers, killing 44 men and injuring another 42. The incident resulted in a case before the International Court of Justice and a fifty-year diplomatic freeze between Albania and the UK, and Yugoslavia never conceded that its ships had laid the mines. The three remaining ships were stricken from the navy list in 1962 and 1963.

== Background ==
The Austro-Hungarian Navy was relatively slow to acquire specialist mine warfare vessels. It mainly utilised destroyers and torpedo boats for these tasks, but during World War I it ordered several classes of small mine warfare vessels, some of which were completed before the end of the war. A class of larger mine warfare ships was ordered from the Ganz & Danubius shipyard at Porto Re (now Kraljevica). A total of fourteen ships were laid down between October 1917 and September 1918 as the MT.130 class. They were originally designed as minelayers, but the navy ordered the first six completed as minesweepers. All were eventually fitted for minesweeping during construction. By September 1918, only the first three had been launched, and even they had not been fully completed. The end of World War I and the dissolution of Austria-Hungary left the ships in various stages of completion, the shipyard itself now part of the newly formed Kingdom of Serbs, Croats and Slovenes (renamed Yugoslavia in 1929). With the creation of the new kingdom, the Ganz & Danubius shipyard became Jadranska Brodogradilišta.

== Description and construction ==
The ships had a raised forecastle on which a gun was to be mounted. The Austro-Hungarian design called for a 47 mm (1.9 in) L/44 gun, (Note: L/44 denotes the length of the barrel. In this case, the L/44 gun is 44 calibre, meaning that the barrel was 44 times as long as the diameter of its bore.) but the actual guns that were fitted when the ships were completed varied between those completed for the Italian Regia Marina (Royal Navy) and those completed later for the Royal Yugoslav Navy (Serbo-Croatian: Kraljevska mornarica; KM). Aft of the gun on the rear section of the forecastle were arranged the captain's cabin on the starboard side and the pantry on the port side. Between the two was the galley, directly below the enclosed steering bridge, which was topped with an open navigation bridge on which a searchlight was mounted. The foremast with a crow's nest was attached to the forward edge of the navigation bridge. Immediately aft of the bridge was the funnel, which was taller in the original design and on the ships completed for the Regina Marina and shorter on the ships completed for the KM. Aft of the funnel was a wide quarterdeck that reached to the stern where a mine crane was installed. On the ships completed for the KM, a deckhouse for the ship's office was added to the forward section of the quarterdeck and a mainmast was installed in the centre of the quarterdeck. The ships completed for the Regia Marina did not have a deckhouse or mainmast, and a winch was installed in the centre of the quarterdeck. Two ship's boats were secured on davits on either side of the quarterdeck.

Below deck, the bow contained the drinking water tanks, aft of which were cabins for the petty officers on either side of the anchor chain locker. Immediately aft of the petty officers' cabins were the sailors' bunks, and underneath these the boiler water and fuel tanks were located. A transverse bulkhead between the sailors' accommodation spaces provided support for the gun. The engine room containing the boiler and engines was located under the galley and was covered by a low superstructure with ventilation cowls. The engine room was separated from the hold by a bulkhead that supported the deckhouse on the KM ships. A workshop was located in the stern.

The ships of the class had a length overall of 31.8 metres (104 ft), a length between perpendiculars of 29.4 m (96 ft 5 in), a beam of 6.52 m (21.4 ft), and a draught of 1.4 m (4 ft 7 in) as a minesweeper and 1.7 m (5 ft 7 in) as a minelayer. At full load they had a displacement of 128 tonnes (126 long tons) as a minesweeper, and 145 tonnes (143 long tons) as a minelayer. They had two vertical triple-expansion steam engines driving one shaft each, with steam provided by a single oil-fired Yarrow boiler. Their engines were rated at 280 indicated horsepower (210 kW), for a maximum speed of 11.6 knots (21.5 km/h; 13.3 mph), but the ships built for the Regia Marina could only achieve a top speed of 11 kn (20 km/h; 13 mph). The cruising speed was 9 kn (17 km/h; 10 mph). Up to 4 tonnes (3.9 long tons) of fuel could be carried in the tanks located below the sailor's accommodation. The ships were very maneuverable due to their excellent length-to-beam ratio (Note: A design with a long hull relative to its beam would be fast but maneuver poorly. A design with a short hull relative to its beam would be slow but maneuver well. The latter is more useful for a minelayer.) and the distance between their propellers. The crew consisted of 29 officers and enlisted men.

As none of the ships were completed before the end of World War I, the planned 47 mm guns were not fitted to any of the ships when built. They were also planned to be fitted with one 8 mm (0.31 in) machine gun mounted aft, and – when completed as minelayers – to carry 24–39 mines, with the number depending on the types of mines loaded. The three ships completed for the Regia Marina – comprising the Albona class – were armed with two Ansaldo Model 1915 76 mm (3 in) L/30 guns, two 8 mm machine guns, and could carry 34 mines. The five ships completed for the KM as the Malinska class were initially armed with a single Škoda 66 mm (2.6 in) L/30 gun – obtained from former Austro-Hungarian Navy stock – and two machine guns, and could carry 24 to 39 mines. The ships completed as minelayers had mine rails fitted to either side of the quarterdeck all the way to the stern. The KM ships later had their 66 mm guns replaced with the originally planned Škoda 47 mm L/44 guns.

The first three ships of the class, MT.130–132, were completed by the shipyard for the Regia Marina in 1920 as RD 58–RD 60, and were then converted to minelayers. On 2 July 1921 they were named the Albona class, and were commissioned as Albona, Laurana and Rovigno, respectively. Albona was named for Italian towns in Istria, Albona, Laurana, and Rovigno. Five other ships, MT.133–137, were completed at the shipyard in 1931 for the KM – as the Malinska or Marjan class – and were commissioned as Marjan, Mosor, Malinska, Meljine, and Mljet respectively. Marjan was named for a hill near Split, Mosor for a mountain range near Split, Malinska for the town on the Dalmatian island of Krk, Meljine for the town in the Bay of Kotor, and Mljet for the Dalmatian island of that name. The hulls of MT.138–MT.143 were 45 per cent finished by October 1918 but were never completed.

== Ships ==
Ships of class
Austro-Hungarian designation	Builder	Laid down	Launched	Completed	Completed for	Name upon completion (tactical designation)
MT.130	Jadranska; Brodogradilišta	27 October 1917	20 July 1918	3 January 1920	Regia Marina	Albona
MT.131	Jadranska; Brodogradilišta	30 October 1917	24 August 1918	7 February 1920	Regia Marina	Laurana
MT.132	Jadranska; Brodogradilišta	3 November 1917	28 September 1918	16 July 1920	Regia Marina	Rovigno
MT.133	Jadranska; Brodogradilišta	6 November 1917	Unknown	1931	Royal Yugoslav Navy	Marjan (MA)
MT.134	Jadranska; Brodogradilišta	7 December 1917	Unknown	1931	Royal Yugoslav Navy	Mosor (MO)
MT.135	Jadranska; Brodogradilišta	8 December 1917	Unknown	1931	Royal Yugoslav Navy	Malinska (MN)
MT.136	Jadranska; Brodogradilišta	29 December 1917	Unknown	1931	Royal Yugoslav Navy	Meljine (ME)
MT.137	Jadranska; Brodogradilišta	29 December 1917	Unknown	1931	Royal Yugoslav Navy	Mljet (MT)
MT.138	Jadranska; Brodogradilišta	11 February 1918	Unknown	Never completed	–	–
MT.139	Jadranska; Brodogradilišta	23 February 1918	Unknown	Never completed	–	–
MT.140	Jadranska; Brodogradilišta	August 1918	Unknown	Never completed	–	–
MT.141	Jadranska; Brodogradilišta	September 1918	Unknown	Never completed	–	–
MT.142	Jadranska; Brodogradilišta	September 1918	Unknown	Never completed	–	–
MT.143	Jadranska; Brodogradilišta	September 1918	Unknown	Never completed	–	–

== Service history ==
=== Albona class ===
The interwar Regia Marina was keen to acquire minelayers, and the Albona class were the first of several classes of mine warfare vessels it obtained. Italy entered World War II in June 1940, at which time, the three Albona-class ships were allocated to the local naval command of the Settore Alto Adriatico (Upper Adriatic Sector) based in Venice, commanded by Ammiraglio di Divisione (Division Admiral) Ferdinando di Savoia. Between June 1940 and the Axis invasion of Yugoslavia in April 1941, the main Italian fleet operated in the Mediterranean Sea. The Italians considered the Adriatic Sea their "backyard", and did not consider the KM a dangerous opponent. Despite considerable activity by Allied submarines in the Adriatic after June 1940, the Italians continued to use it for training. Between 6 June and 10 July 1940, the three Albona-class ships, along with the Azio-class minelayer Azio and auxiliary minesweeper San Guisto laid 21 defensive minefields in the northern Adriatic, consisting of 769 mines. While British and Greek submarines operated in the Adriatic during this period of the war, Allied submarines laid few mines there, with the only significant work being undertaken by the Grampus-class mine-laying submarine HMS Rorqual off the Italian port of Ancona and the Yugoslav islands of Premuda and Susak in the northern Adriatic in late January 1941.

In 1941, Laurana was fitted with smoke apparatus to assist in the defence of Venice. By mid-May of that year, Albona and Rovigno had been transferred to Greek waters. Following the Italian Armistice in early September 1943, Albona and Rovigno were captured by the Germans at the island of Syros in the Aegean Sea on 10 September. They were renamed Netztender 57 and Netztender 56 respectively, and their armament was improved. Between 19 July and 4 September 1943, Laurana laid a 70-mine defensive barrage in the Adriatic. Laurana was captured at Venice on 11 September, and was commissioned by the Germans under her Italian name on 30 September, although she was still at Venice and not operational on 10 October, and not ready for service as part of the 11th Security Flotilla of the Kriegsmarine (German Navy) until after 8 November. She served as a minelayer in the Adriatic with her Italian armament.

Netztender 57 and Netztender 56 were scuttled by the Germans at Salonika on 31 October 1944 as they withdrew from the city, and Laurana was sunk at Trieste by British aircraft bombs on 20 February 1945, and was broken up in 1949.

=== Malinska class ===
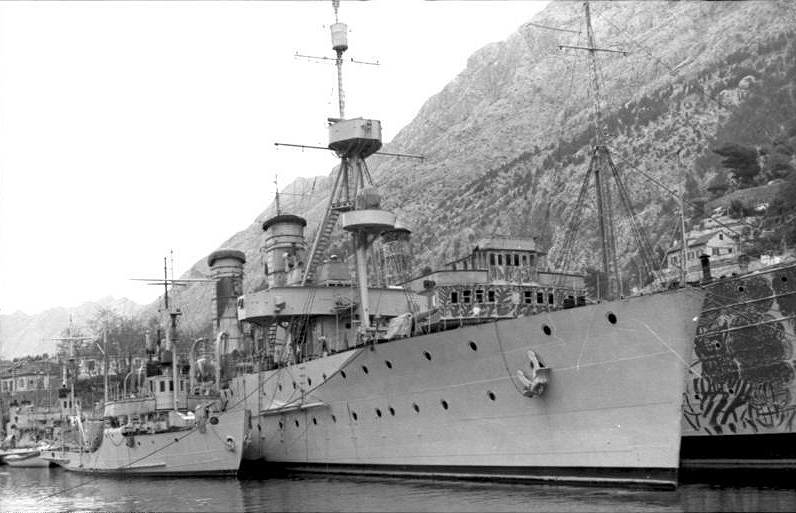
Mljet and Meljine (left) with the light cruiser Dalmacija (right), photographed in Kotor after being captured by Axis forces

The Malinska-class ships had a relatively quiet career until 1941, serving as training vessels and minesweepers allocated to the Coast Defence Command. By 1936, the Malinska class were classified as minelayers. On 26 January 1939, Malinska, under the command of Poručnik bojnog broda II. klase (lieutenant commander, junior grade) Aleksandar Berić, suffered boiler failure and was blown by the wind towards the coast south of Dubrovnik. The Galeb-class minelayer Sokol, under the command of Kapetan fregate (Frigate captain) Mirko Pleiweiss, sailed to assist from the Bay of Kotor, and towed her to a secure mooring. At the start of the German-led Axis invasion of Yugoslavia, the five Malinska-class ships were assigned to the Coast Defence Command and spread over three sectors; Malinska in Selce (North Sector), Mosor and Marjan in Šibenik (Central Sector), and Mljet and Meljine in the Bay of Kotor (South Sector). The ships at Šibenik and the Bay of Kotor were captured in port by the Italians without incident.

The North Sector was commanded by now-Kapetan bojnog broda (Captain) Pleiweiss, who was an ethnic Slovene. When the establishment of the fascist Axis puppet state, the Independent State of Croatia (NDH), was declared on 10 April, Pleiweiss decided to take action against a related revolt by ethnic Croat officers in nearby Crikvenica, with whom he, as a Slovene and loyal Yugoslav naval officer, had no sympathy. During Pleiweiss' action against the Croat officers, Petar Milutin Kvaternik was killed. Kvaternik was the brother of Slavko Kvaternik, a senior member of the ultranationalist Ustaše movement who had announced the establishment of the NDH with German encouragement and support. Given that the Royal Yugoslav Army was retreating, and Selce could not be defended from the advancing Italians, Pleiweiss decided to scuttle seven Yugoslav coastal passenger steamers under his control that were anchored in Klimno Bay on the island of Krk. They sank in only 2 m (6 ft 7 in) of water, making them easy for the Italians to salvage later. Pleiweiss boarded Malinska and ordered her, the naval tug Silni and two boats of the Financial Guard south along the coast. By the time Malinska reached the mouth of the Zrmanja river near Zadar, the other boats had dispersed, and due to her shallow draught, Malinska was able to navigate the river as far as Obrovac, where she was scuttled on 13 April. Pleiweiss subsequently escaped to the Italian-annexed Province of Ljubljana where he avoided any consequences for his actions during the Axis invasion. After the war he was celebrated as a Yugoslav war hero.

Malinska was raised by the Italians and commissioned as Arbe, along with Ugliano (ex-Marjan), Solta (ex-Meljine), Meleda (ex-Mljet) and Pasman (ex-Mosor) using the Italian names for the islands of Rab, Ugljan, Šolta, Mljet and Pašman. In Italian service the ships were known as the Arbe class. The Italians removed the mainmasts from the ships, removed the 47 mm guns, and installed two Ansaldo Model 15 76 mm L/30 guns as on the Albona class. They also mounted a Breda M37 8 mm heavy machine gun on both of the bridge wings. They could carry 30 mines.

On 28 December 1942, the Yugoslav Partisans established their first naval station at Podgora on the Dalmatian coast. From this base, the fledgling Partisan Navy attacked and captured five coastal steamships over the next few days. On 1 January 1943, Ugliano and Pasman, along with the captured Yugoslav torpedo boat T5, a patrol vessel and an armed tug, attacked Podgora from the sea, and an Italian landing party was put ashore. The Italian troops were repelled by the Partisan 4th Dalmatian Brigade. The operation was repeated three days later, with the addition of air support, but a planned second landing was cancelled. In April 1943, Ugliano and Pasman were under command of Maridalmazia (the maritime command of Dalmatia), along with five captured Yugoslav 250t-class torpedo boats and various smaller vessels.

Arbe was under repair at Genoa when she was captured by the Germans at the time of the Italian surrender in September 1943, but was not commissioned by them. Instead, she was transferred to the navy of the German fascist puppet state, the Italian Social Republic in December 1943. She was scuttled during the German retreat from the city on 24 April 1945, and was salvaged and scrapped after the war. Ugliano, Solta and Meleda escaped to the Allies at the time of the Italian surrender, eventually making their way to Malta. Solta and Meleda were returned by the Italians to the KM-in-exile on 7 December 1943 and Ugliano was returned on 16 February 1944; all reverted to their previous names. They swept mines off Malta in 1944 and 1945 and in August of that year were transferred to the new Yugoslav Navy (Serbo-Croatian: Jugoslavenska ratna mornarica; JRM).

Pasman was captured by the Germans at Šibenik after the Italian surrender but was initially not operational. By 8 November 1943 she was almost ready for service as part of the 11th Security Flotilla. On 20 December she was taken over by the crew of the German landing ship SF 193 which had been sunk by British motor torpedo boats near Murter Island on 18 December. In German service Pasman had a crew of 26 German and 4 Croatian sailors. It was intended to hand Pasman over to the Navy of the NDH, and on 29 December she sailed for Pula via Zadar for further repairs, towed by the coastal steamer Guido Brunner due to poor weather. As the weather improved, Pasman continued alone and left Zadar at 17:00 on 31 December. Due to reduced visibility in the sea mist, Pasman stranded in a bay on the island of Ist not long after leaving Zadar. Her crew were unable to free her, and on 5 January 1944 the crew of the Partisan armed ship NB 3 Jadran captured the German and Croat crew. The Germans planned to rescue the crew with an operation involving 50–60 troops transported and supported by the German torpedo boat TA22 (the former Italian torpedo boat Giuseppe Missori) and two other ships, Medea and Scarpanto. This operation was postponed to 9 January due to poor weather, and when the Germans finally landed on Ist they could not locate Pasman's crew, but took 54 male residents of the island to Pula as hostages. Pasman remained on Ist and was stricken on 13 January, and her wreck was scrapped in situ in 1954.

=== Post-war service ===
After the war, Marjan, Meljine and Mljet were commissioned in the JRM as M1, M2 and M3 respectively. They were later redesignated M201 then M31 (ex-M1), M202 then M32 (ex-M2) and M203 then M33 (ex-M3). All three ships were re-armed with two Breda 20 mm (0.79 in) L65 anti-aircraft guns, equipped with MDL-2 mechanical minesweeping gear, and could carry up to 24 SAG-2 mines. Their crew increased to 30. Post-war, the engines of ships of the class could only generate 150 ihp (110 kW), for a maximum speed of 8.5 kn (15.7 km/h; 9.8 mph) and a cruising speed of 7 kn (13 km/h; 8.1 mph). Their range was 360 nmi (670 km; 410 mi) at 8.5 kn and 420 nmi (780 km; 480 mi) at 7 kn. Up to 13 t (13 long tons; 14 short tons) of oil and 8 t (7.9 long tons; 8.8 short tons) of boiler water was carried.

In 1946, M2 and M3 were involved in an early international incident of the Cold War when they laid mines in the Straits of Corfu at the request of the People's Socialist Republic of Albania. On 22 October of that year, a British destroyer flotilla entered the undeclared minefield and the S and T-class destroyer HMS Saumarez and U and V-class destroyer HMS Volage were seriously damaged. Forty-four officers and men were killed or missing, and forty-two were injured. Saumarez was damaged beyond repair, but Volage was eventually brought back into service as an anti-submarine frigate. The incident resulted in a case before the International Court of Justice which found against Albania, and a diplomatic freeze between the UK and Albania that was only finally resolved in 1996. The Yugoslav government never admitted that M2 and M3 had laid the mines.

M33 was stricken in 1962. M31 was stricken in 1963 and sold to the Maritime High School in Split, where it served as the training ship Juraj Carić until 1972. M32 was also stricken in 1963 and it was sold to the Vela Luka municipal council on the island of Korčula.

== See also ==
- List of ships of the Royal Yugoslav Navy
- List of ships of the Yugoslav Navy
