= Kraljevica-class patrol boat =

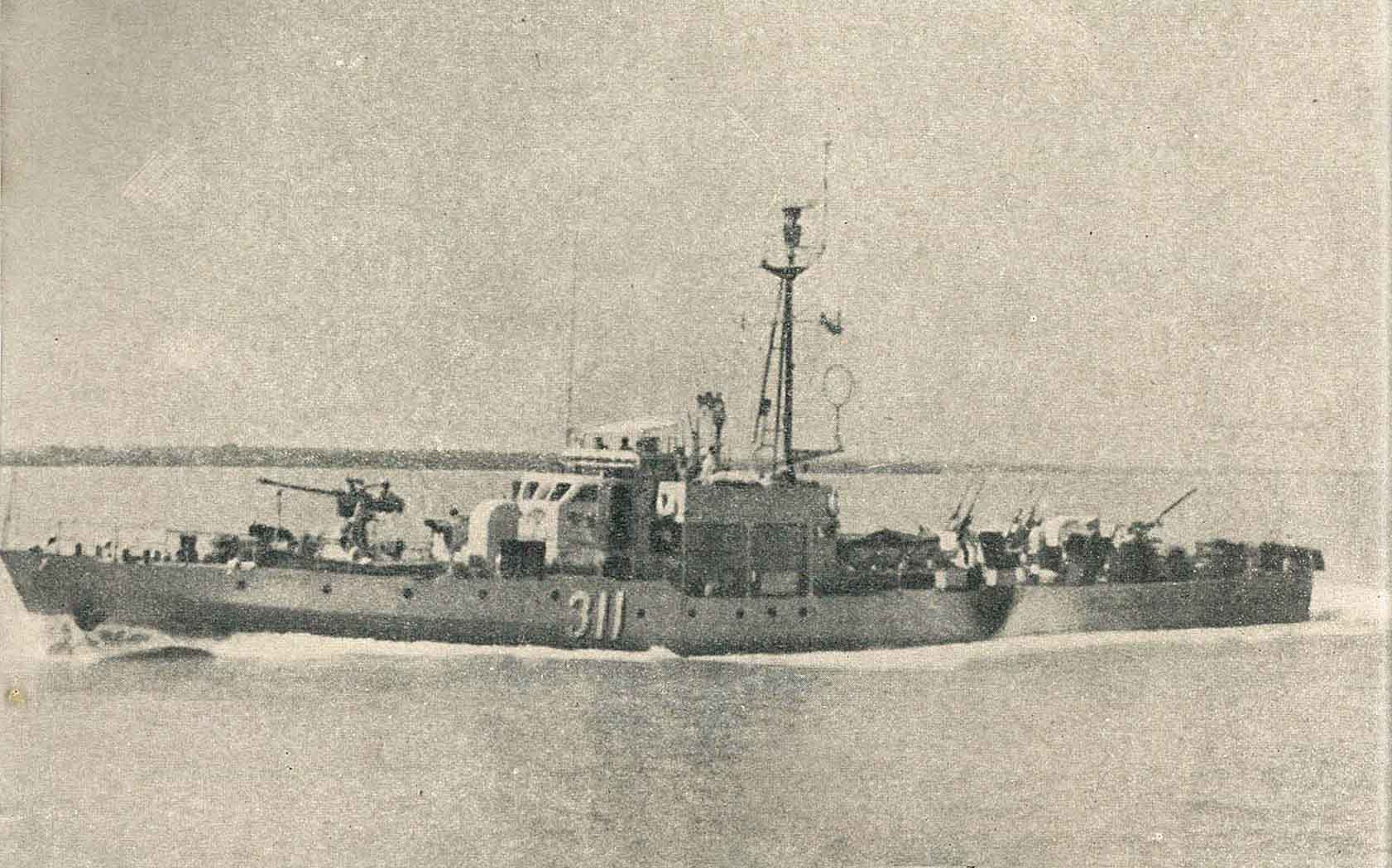
- RI Dorang (311), an Indonesian Navy Kraljevica-class

Class overview
- Builders: Tito's Shipyard, Kraljevica, PR Croatia, FPR Yugoslavia
- Operators: Yugoslav Navy; Bangladesh Navy; Ethiopian Navy; Indonesian Navy; Sudanese Navy
- Succeeded by: Mornar class
- Built: 1951–1957
- In commission: 1951–late 1980s
- Completed: 24
- Retired: 24

General characteristics (First series)
- Type: Anti-submarine patrol boat
- Displacement: Standard: 195 tonnes (192 long tons; 215 short tons) Full: 220 tonnes (217 long tons; 243 short tons)
- Length: 41 m (134 ft 6 in)
- Beam: 6.3 m (20 ft 8 in)
- Draught: 1.7 m (5 ft 7 in)
- Installed power: 3,000 hp (2,200 kW)
- Propulsion: 2 × shafts 2 × diesel engines
- Speed: 17 knots (31 km/h; 20 mph)
- Range: 1,000 nmi (1,900 km; 1,200 mi) at 12 knots (22 km/h; 14 mph)
- Armament: 1 × 76 mm (3.0 in) naval gun; 1 × 40 mm (1.6 in) gun; 4 × 20 mm (0.79 in) single-barrelled guns; 2 × Mousetrap or 1 × Hedgehog

The Kraljevica class was a class of large anti-submarine patrol boats built for the Yugoslav Navy (Serbo-Croatian: Jugoslavenska ratna mornarica – JRM) during the 1950s. Built by the Tito's Shipyard in Kraljevica, the 24 boats of the class were built in two series, the first from 1951 until 1954 (PBR-501 – PBR-512) and the second from 1954 until 1957 (PBR-513 – PBR-524). Although similar in layout, boats of the second series featured a slightly larger displacement and more powerful machinery.

Boats of the first series were stricken from the JRM inventory in 1983–86 while the last of second series were stricken in 1986–90. A number of these boats were exported to countries of the Non-Aligned Movement: per two boats to Bangladesh and Sudan, six to Indonesia and a single boat to Ethiopia. These were retired during the 1980s with the last operational boats appearing to be two in Indonesian service which were placed in reserve in 1989.

== Description and construction ==
The 24 boats of the Kraljevica class were built by the Tito's Shipyard in two series. The first series, designated Č01 by the shipyard, consisted of twelve boats and was built from 1951 until 1954 (PBR-501 – PBR-512). The boats of this series measured 41 m (134 ft 6 in) in length with a 6.3 m (20 ft 8 in) beam and a draught of 1.7 m (5 ft 7 in). Standard displacement measured 195 tonnes (192 long tons; 215 short tons) while fully loaded they displaced 220 tonnes (217 long tons; 243 short tons). Propulsion consisted of two diesel engines powering two shafts for a total of power output of 3,000 hp (2,200 kW), enabling a speed of 17 knots (31 km/h; 20 mph) and range of 1,000 nmi (1,900 km; 1,200 mi) at 12 knots (22 km/h; 14 mph).

Gun armament consisted of a single 3"/50 caliber gun, a single 40 mm (1.6 in) gun and four single-barrelled 20 mm (0.79 in) guns. Anti-submarine weapons consisted of two Mark 6 depth charge (DC) throwers, DC racks and either two Mousetraps or a single Hedgehog. During the 1970s the first series underwent modernization which included the removal of the 3"/50 caliber gun in favor two five-barrelled Soviet-made RBU-1200 rocket launchers with the addition of a Tamir-11 sonar.

The second series, designated Č01/B, also consisted of twelve boats and was built from 1954 until 1957 (PBR-513 – PBR-524). The boats of this series featured a slightly longer hull (43.1 m (141 ft 5 in)) and a deeper draught of 1.8 m (5 ft 11 in). The propulsion was uprated to 3,400 hp (2,500 kW) for an increased speed of 19 knots (35 km/h; 22 mph).

== Boats ==
Name	Builder	Series	Completed	Fate
PBR-501	Tito's Shipyard	I. series Č01	1951	Stricken in 1983–86
PBR-502	Tito's Shipyard	I. series Č01	1951	Transferred to Bangladesh in 1975.
PBR-503	Tito's Shipyard	I. series Č01	1952	Stricken in 1983–86
PBR-504	Tito's Shipyard	I. series Č01	1952	Stricken in 1983–86
PBR-505	Tito's Shipyard	I. series Č01	1952	Transferred to Bangladesh in 1975.
PBR-506	Tito's Shipyard	I. series Č01	1952	Stricken in 1983–86
PBR-507	Tito's Shipyard	I. series Č01	1953	Stricken in 1983–86
PBR-508	Tito's Shipyard	I. series Č01	1953	Stricken in 1983–86
PBR-509	Tito's Shipyard	I. series Č01	1953	Transferred to Ethiopia in 1975.
PBR-510	Tito's Shipyard	I. series Č01	1953	Stricken in 1983–86
PBR-511	Tito's Shipyard	I. series Č01	1953	Stricken in 1983–86
PBR-512	Tito's Shipyard	I. series Č01	1954	Sunk as a target ship in 1983.
PBR-513	Tito's Shipyard	II. series Č01/B	1954	Transferred to Indonesia in 1958/59.
PBR-514	Tito's Shipyard	II. series Č01/B	1954	Transferred to Indonesia in 1958/59.
PBR-515	Tito's Shipyard	II. series Č01/B	1954	Transferred to Indonesia in 1958/59.
PBR-516	Tito's Shipyard	II. series Č01/B	1955	Transferred to Indonesia in 1958/59.
PBR-517	Tito's Shipyard	II. series Č01/B	1955	Transferred to Indonesia in 1958/59.
PBR-518	Tito's Shipyard	II. series Č01/B	1955	Transferred to Indonesia in 1958/59.
PBR-519	Tito's Shipyard	II. series Č01/B	1956	Stricken in 1983–90
PBR-520	Tito's Shipyard	II. series Č01/B	1956	Stricken in 1983–90
PBR-521	Tito's Shipyard	II. series Č01/B	1956	Stricken in 1983–90
PBR-522	Tito's Shipyard	II. series Č01/B	1956	Transferred to Sudan in 1969.
PBR-523	Tito's Shipyard	II. series Č01/B	1956	Transferred to Sudan in 1969.
PBR-524	Tito's Shipyard	II. series Č01/B	1957	Stricken in 1983–90

Sources: Shipyard Kraljevica - List of Delivered Vessels 1946. - 2007., Gardiner (1995, p. 647)

== Service history ==
Boats of the first series in JRM service were stricken between 1983 and 1986. The last boat of the series, PBR-512, was decommissioned in 1972 and sunk as a target ship in 1983 in the vicinity of the Bay of Kotor. The boat was targeted with a P-20 anti-ship missile which had its warhead removed. After sustaining a direct hit, a tugboat attempted to tow it to the "Sava Kovačević" Naval Repair Yard in Tivat to be repaired and reused in a future naval exercise. However, while in tow the boat began taking on water through the hole punctured by the missile. The boat was finally cut loose and sunk in the Žanjic cove to a depth of 25 m (82 ft). Due to its favorable location and diving conditions, the wreck of PBR-512 became the most popular wreck diving site in Montenegro.

The Kraljevica boats proved to be the most widely exported ship class built by SFR Yugoslavia. A total of eleven boats were transferred to countries of the Non-Aligned Movement of which Yugoslavia was one of the founding members. The first country to receive the boats was Indonesia which took possession of PBR-513 to PBR-518 during 1958/59, followed by PBR-522 and PBR-523 to Sudan in 1969, PBR-502 and PBR-505 to Bangladesh and PBR-509 to Ethiopia, the latter two receiving their boats in 1975. In Indonesian service, the boats first received numerical designations ranging from 310-312 and 314-316. In c. 1976 they were renamed Dorang (ex-PBR-513), Todak (ex-PBR-514), Lajang (ex-PBR-515), Bubara (ex-PBR-516), Lemadang (ex-PBR-517) and Krapu (ex-PBR-518). Bubara and Lajang were stricken in 1970, followed by Krapu in 1976 and Lemadang in 1984. The remaining two boats, the Dorang and Todak, were placed in reserve in 1989. Two boats in Bangladeshi service received designations Karnaphuli (ex-PBR-502) and Tista (ex-PBR-505) and were discarded by 1988. The two Sudanese boats, El Fasher (ex-PBR-522) and El Khartoum (ex-PBR-523) were hulked in 1981. The single boat in Ethiopian service received the designation 51 (ex-PBR-509) and was out of service by 1984.
