= Mornar-class patrol boat =

Class overview
- Builders: Tito's Shipyard, Kraljevica, PR Croatia, FPR Yugoslavia
- Operators: Yugoslav Navy
- Preceded by: Kraljevica class
- Succeeded by: Type 132
- Built: 1957–1959 (Mornar) 1964–1965 (Borac)
- In commission: 1959–1992
- Completed: 2
- Retired: 2

General characteristics (weapons configuration as reported in 1989/90)
- Type: Patrol boat
- Displacement: Standard: 330 tonnes (320 long tons; 360 short tons) Full: 430 tonnes (420 long tons; 470 short tons)
- Length: 53.3 m (174 ft 10 in)
- Beam: 7 m (23 ft 0 in)
- Draught: 2 m (6 ft 7 in)
- Installed power: 3,250 hp (2,420 kW)
- Propulsion: 2 × shafts 4 × diesel engines
- Speed: 20 knots (37 km/h; 23 mph)
- Range: 3,000 nmi (5,600 km; 3,500 mi) at 12 knots (22 km/h; 14 mph) 2,000 nmi (3,700 km; 2,300 mi) at 15 knots (28 km/h; 17 mph)
- Armament: 2 × 40 mm (1.6 in) guns; 2 × 20 mm (0.79 in) single-barrelled guns; 4 × RBU-1200

The Mornar class consisted of two large patrol boats (Note: The Yugoslav Navy classified these boats as patrolni brod (transl. Patrol Ship), while the 1989/90 edition of Jane's Fighting Ships referred to them as corvettes.) built for the Yugoslav Navy (Serbo-Croatian: Jugoslavenska ratna mornarica – JRM) by the Tito's Shipyard in Kraljevica during the late 1950s and early 1960s. The boats were based on the Udarnik (PBR-581), a French-built Le Fougueux-class submarine chaser acquired in 1956. Both boats had an uneventful career and were deleted in 1992.

== Description and construction ==
The Mornar class consisted of just two boats: Mornar (PBR-551) which was laid down in 1957, launched in 1958 and commissioned on 10 September 1959, followed by Borac (PBR-552) which was laid down in 1964 and launched and commissioned in 1965. (Note: There are certain discrepancies regarding the date of construction of Mornar (PBR-551) and Borac (PBR-552). According to Sharpe (1989, p. 799) the boats were completed in 1959 and 1965 respectively. The Croatian Technical Encyclopedia lists Mornar as completed in 1957 and Borac in 1965, while the List of Delivered Vessel by the Kraljevica Shipyard lists both as being completed in 1957.) The class was based on the Udarnik (PBR-581), a French-built submarine chaser of the Le Fougueux-class, which was acquired by Yugoslavia in 1956.

The boats measured 53.3 m (174 ft 10 in) in length with a 7 m (23 ft 0 in) beam and a draught of 2 m (6 ft 7 in). Standard displacement measured 330 tonnes (320 long tons; 360 short tons) while fully loaded they displaced 430 tonnes (420 long tons; 470 short tons). Propulsion consisted of four SEMT Pielstick PA17V diesel engines powering two shafts for a total of power output of 3,250 hp (2,420 kW), enabling a speed of 20 knots (37 km/h; 23 mph) and range of 3,000 nmi (5,600 km; 3,500 mi) at 12 knots (22 km/h; 14 mph) or 2,000 nmi (3,700 km; 2,300 mi) at 15 knots (28 km/h; 17 mph).

Their original gun armament consisted of two 3"/50 caliber guns, two single-barrelled 40 mm (1.6 in) guns and two single-barrelled 20 mm (0.79 in) guns. Anti-submarine weapons consisted of two Mark 6 depth charge (DC) throwers and two Mark 9 DC racks. Both boats were modernized during 1970/73 at the "Sava Kovačević" Naval Repair Yard in Tivat; their 76 mm guns were removed and four five-barrelled Soviet-built RBU-1200 were installed along with a Tamir-11 sonar.

== Service history ==
The boats enjoyed a long, albeit uneventful, career in the Yugoslav Navy and both were stricken in 1992.
