= Croatian missile boat Kralj Petar Krešimir IV =

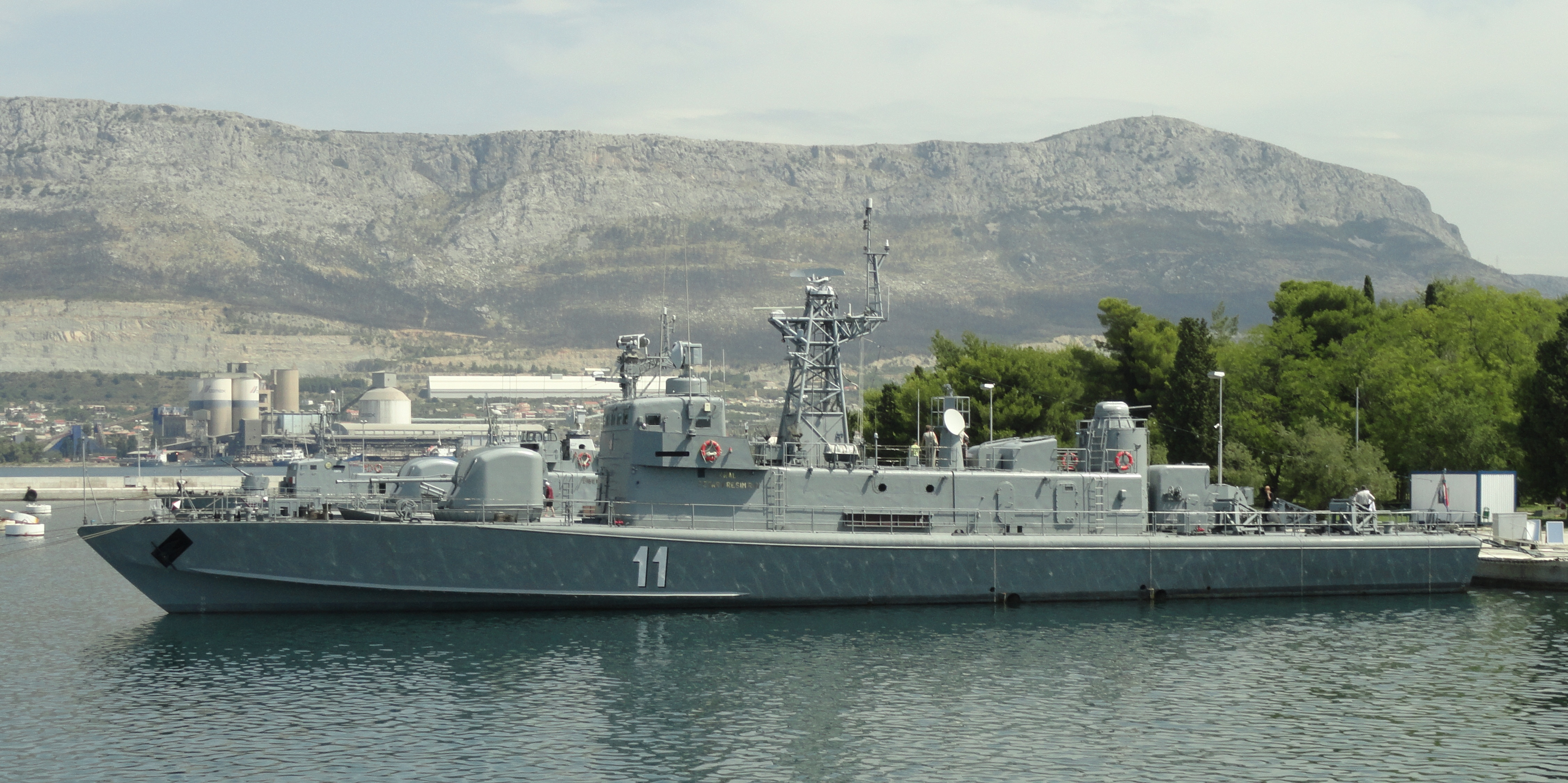
- Kralj Petar Krešimir IV in the Lora Naval base in August 2011. Note that the RBS-15 launchers on the stern have been removed.

History

SFR Yugoslavia
- Name: Sergej Mašera
- Namesake: Sergej Mašera
- Builder: Kraljevica Shipyard, Kraljevica, Croatia
- Identification: RTOP-501
- Fate: Captured unfinished by Croatian forces

Croatia
- Namesake: Peter Krešimir IV of Croatia
- Launched: 21 March 1992
- Sponsored by: Franjo Tuđman
- Commissioned: 7 June 1992
- Identification: RTOP-11

General characteristics
- Class & type: Kralj-class missile boat
- Displacement: Standard: 315 tonnes (310 long tons); Full: 382 tonnes (376 long tons)
- Length: 53.6 m (175 ft 10 in)
- Beam: 8.6 m (28 ft 3 in)
- Draught: 2.7 m (8 ft 10 in)
- Propulsion: Three shafts; 3 × M-504 diesel engines; total of 11,300 kW (15,200 hp)
- Speed: Maximum: 36 knots (67 km/h; 41 mph); Continuous: 32.8 knots (60.7 km/h; 37.7 mph)
- Complement: 33
- Armament: 4–8 × RBS-15 anti-ship missiles; 1 × Bofors 57 mm (2.2 in) D70 gun; 1 × AK-630 CIWS

Kralj Petar Krešimir IV (pennant number RTOP-11) is a Kralj-class missile boat in service with the Croatian Navy. It was laid down in 1990 at the Kraljevica Shipyard as the first ship in a new class being built for the Yugoslav Navy. As the Croatian War of Independence started gaining momentum, shipyard workers stalled the completion of the ship until the remaining Yugoslav forces retreated, preserving the ship for the Croatian Navy that was being formed.

After entering service, Kralj Petar Krešimir IV along with Šibenik represented the navy's main surface combatants until the end of the war, without participating in combat. Both missile boats were used in the Posejdon '94 exercise in October 1994. Although Kralj Petar Krešimir IV was plagued with engine malfunctions and other equipment problems throughout its service life, it continues to serve with the Flotilla of the Croatian Navy along with four other missile boats.

The ship was the main motive for a series of postage stamps issued by the Hrvatska pošta as well as souvenir coins.

== Design and construction ==
Kralj Petar Krešimir IV was laid down in 1991 in the Kraljevica Shipyard as the first ship of the new Kobra-class missile boats that were planned for the Yugoslav Navy (JRM). The ship was to be named after Sergej Mašera (pennant number RTOP-501) who prevented the destroyer Zagreb from falling into Italian hands during the Invasion of Yugoslavia. As the Croatian War of Independence broke out, shipyard workers stalled the completion of the ship until all of the Yugoslav Forces retreated following the Battle of the Barracks so they could not take the ship with them. It was launched on 21 March 1992. Although there were proposals to name the ship after the city of Vukovar that was heavily damaged during the Battle of Vukovar, Franjo Tuđman, Croatian president at the time, suggested naming the ship in accordance with Croatia's naval history. Petar Krešimir IV carries the name of a Croatian medieval king ("kralj" meaning "king"), Peter Krešimir IV of Croatia, who is often viewed in Croatia as having expanded the kingdom of Croatia to incorporate the Dalmatian coast and its islands.

Kralj Petar Krešimir IV measures 53.6 m (176 ft) in length, has a beam of 8.6 m (28 ft) and draught of 2.7 m (8.9 ft). Fully loaded the ship displaces 382 tonnes (376 long tons) while standard displacement measures 315 tonnes (310 long tons).

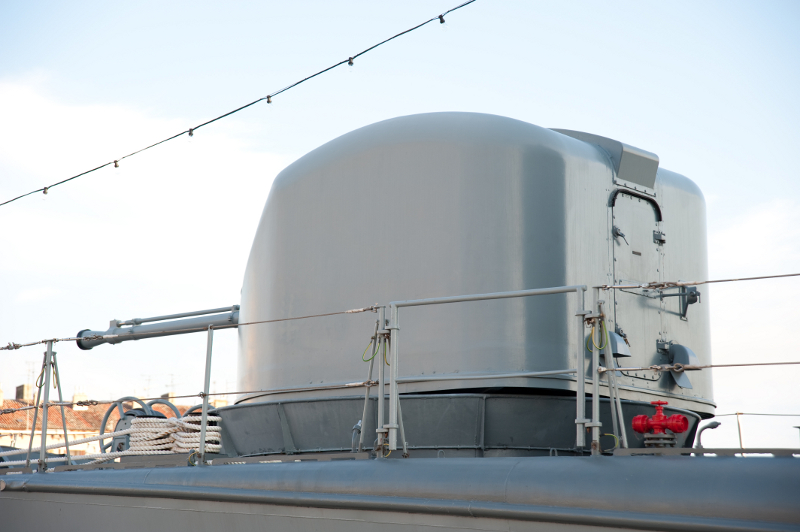
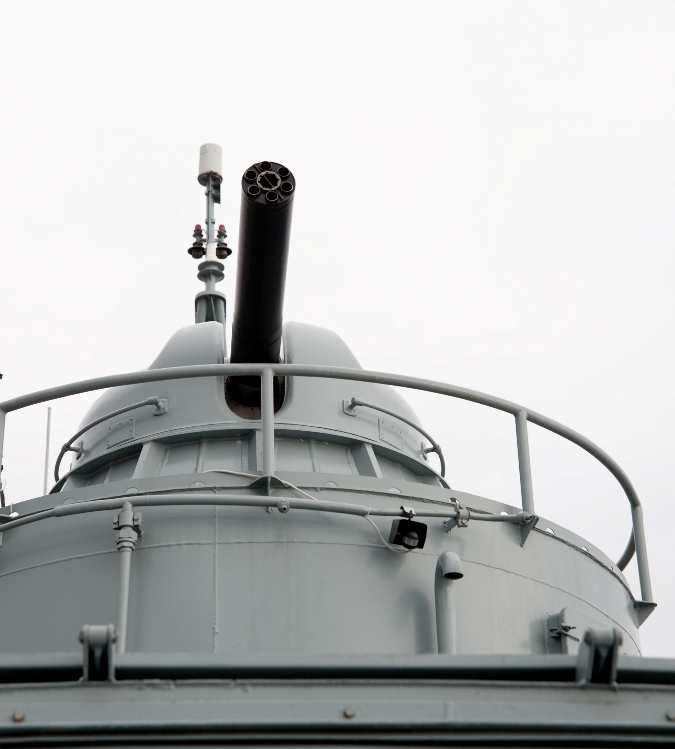
The ship's gun armament consists of a 57 mm (2.2 in) Bofors (left) and a 30 mm (1.2 in) AK-630 (right).

Propulsion consists of three Zvezda M504B-2 diesel engines mounted on three shafts, putting out 12,500 horsepower (9,300 kW) which enables a maximum speed of 36 knots (67 km/h; 41 mph) and a continuous speed of 32.8 knots (60.7 km/h; 37.7 mph). At a speed of 18 knots (33 km/h; 21 mph) the ship has a range of 1,700 nautical miles (3,100 km; 2,000 mi) with a 10-day endurance. The ship has a complement of 33, consisting of six officers, 19 NCOs and eight seamen.

The ship's principal armament consists of 4–8 RBS-15 anti-ship missiles. Gun armament consists of a single Bofors 57 mm D70 on the ship's bow and a single AK-630 CIWS placed on a higher position towards the stern. Four AIM-70 or six SAG-1 naval mines can be deployed in place of the missile launchers. Self-defense systems are made of two Wallop "Barricade" chaff/infrared decoy launchers paired with radar and laser radiation detectors. Ship sensors include a Racal-Decca BT 502 surface search and Racal-Decca 1290A navigational radar mounted on the ship's mast, as well as a Philips PEAB 9LV 249 Mk2 fire-control radar mounted above the bridge and used for guiding the ship's gun armament. A RIZ PP10M sonar is used for detecting underwater special forces operating in the near vicinity of the ship.

== Service history ==
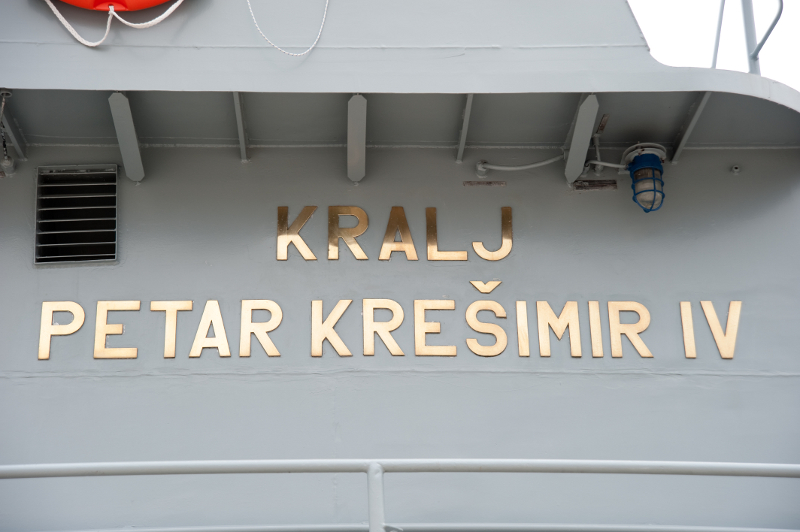
The ship's name on the port side of the hull

Kralj Petar Krešimir IV was commissioned with the Croatian Navy on 7 June 1992. On 28 October 1992 Tuđman arrived on the island of Vis onboard Petar Krešimir IV escorted by the missile boat Dubrovnik and the torpedo boat Vukovar. The next day Petar Krešimir IV transported Tuđman to the city of Dubrovnik. In October 1994, Kralj Petar Krešimir IV and Šibenik participated in the "Posejdon '94" exercise conducted jointly with the Croatian Air Force and Air Defence. The event was the first time Croatian Navy ships live fired an RBS-15 anti-ship missile and would also be the only instance of the RBS-15 missiles being used for the next 21 years. The next live firings didn't happen until 2015 when a single missile was launched from a coastal launcher and another one from Petar Krešimir IV's sister ship, Kralj Dmitar Zvonimir.

The ship's engines proved to be problematic since it was commissioned; because they were designed for providing high speed bursts during a short period of time, they're not suited for longer patrols at lower speeds, have a high fuel consumption and have been partially operational for most of the time; problems that would plague Kralj Petar Krešimir IV throughout its service life.

In 2004 one of its engines was out of order with the two remaining ones in need of an overhaul. The fire control system for the ship to ship missiles was non operational for some time at that point. A 2005 study highlighted the need for the modernization of Kralj Petar Krešimir IV with its engines and combat systems being designated as a priority. In June 2006 the Ministry of Defense issued the Croatian Armed Forces Long Term Development Plan 2006–2015 (hr. Dugoročni plan razvoja Oružanih snaga Republike Hrvatske 2006–2015) in which it was stated that one of the Navy's priorities was equipping Kralj Petar Krešimir IV with new engines and anti-aircraft systems. The planned modernisation wasn't carried out, instead the ship was docked and underwent only basic maintenance during 2010.

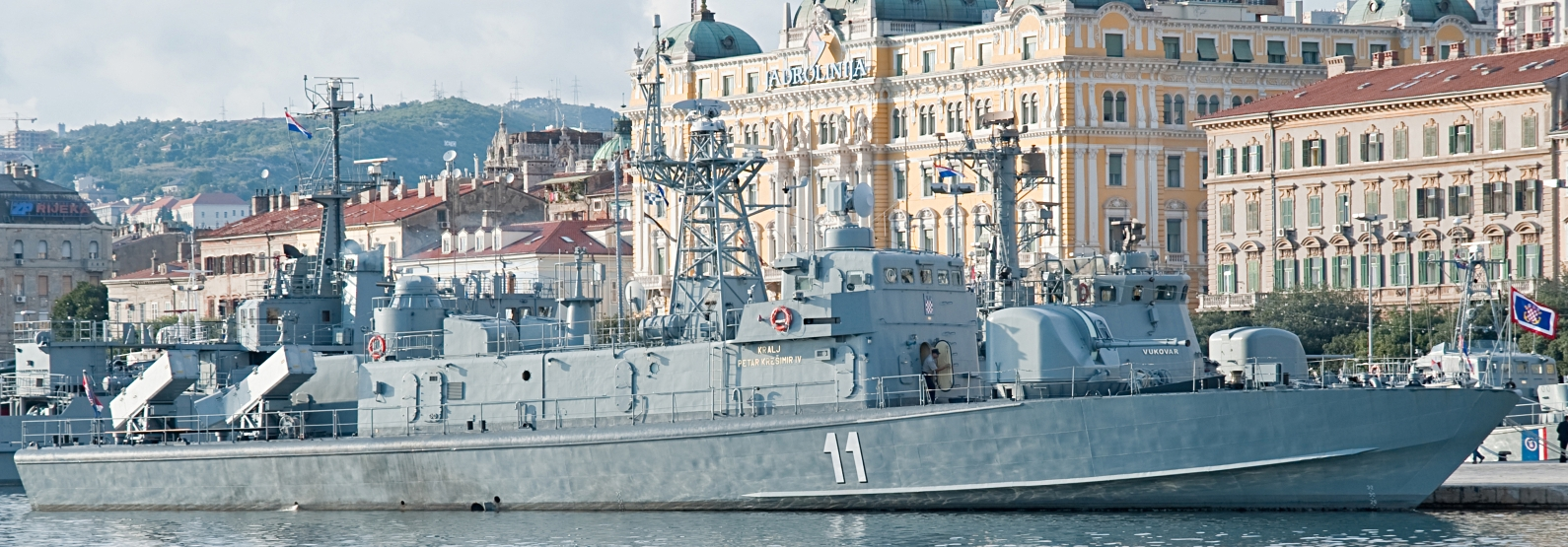
Kralj Petar Krešimir IV during the Croatian Navy Day on 18 September 2009 in Rijeka.

On 28 August 2008 Slobodna Dalmacija reported that certain countries were interested in buying Kralj Petar Krešimir IV, among them Georgia who lost most its fleet during the Russia–Georgia war; according to the report, the deal was stopped by Russia. Although the MoD declined to comment on the potential sale to Georgia, they did confirm that they would consider offers if any were given, as well as that the ship would remain in service until a deal was made. In 2010 frigate lieutenant Antonija Didović assumed command of Kralj Petar Krešimir IV becoming the first female commander in the Navy's history. Didović began her officer career in January 2006 as the commanding officer of the Ship's Weapon Section (Oružni brodski odred) before being promoted to first officer in 2008 and finally commander on 1 July 2010.

A report about the state of the armed forces in 2011 stressed out the inoperability of the engines on Petar Krešimir IV as the single biggest maintenance problem for the Navy. In November 2013 the MoD announced the overhaul of Kralj Petar Krešimir IV as one of their plans for 2014. Work on the ship which included a major overhaul of its engines, was finished by 18 June 2014 at the Prgin nautical center in Šibenik. After a test drive at maximum speed, the ship was once again declared fully operational; for the first time since mid-2011 when it was out of service because of technical problems.

== Accolades ==
Kralj Petar Krešimir IV was featured in a series of postage stamps issued by the Hrvatska pošta named "Hrvatsko brodovlje" (en. Croatian ships). Published from 27 August 1998, the series was printed in two million copies. In 2012 the Croatian Numismatic Club issued a souvenir coin marking the 20th anniversary of the ship being launched.

== See also ==
- List of active Croatian Navy ships
