= Croatian missile boat Kralj Dmitar Zvonimir =

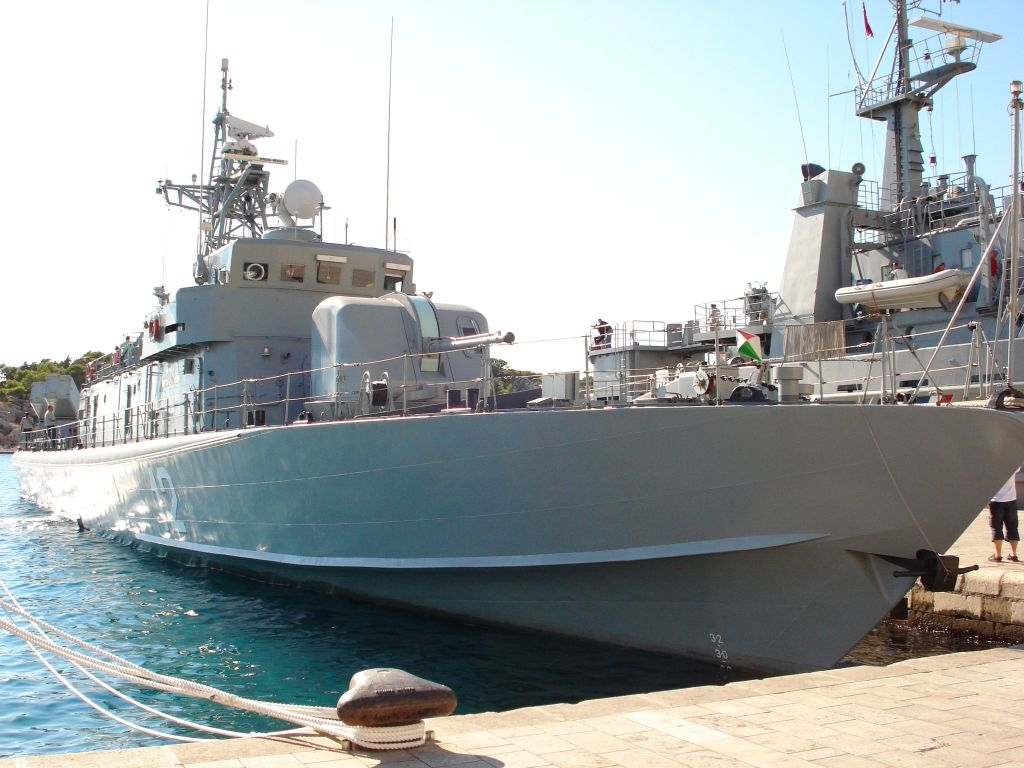
- Kralj Dmitar Zvonimir in Makarska during the Croatian Navy Day in 2008.

History

Croatia
- Operator: Croatian Navy
- Builder: Kraljevica Shipyard, Kraljevica, Croatia
- Laid down: 1993
- Launched: 2001

General characteristics
- Class & type: Kralj-class missile boat
- Length: 54.3 m (178 ft 2 in)
- Beam: 8.5 m (27 ft 11 in)
- Draught: 2.8 m (9 ft 2 in)
- Propulsion: Three shafts; 3 × M-504 diesel engines; total of 11,300 kW (15,200 hp)
- Speed: Maximum: 36 knots (67 km/h; 41 mph); Continuous: 32.8 knots (60.7 km/h; 37.7 mph)
- Complement: 33
- Armament: 4–8 × RBS-15 anti-ship missiles; 1 × Bofors 57 mm (2.2 in) D70 gun; 1 × AK-630 CIWS

Kralj Dmitar Zvonimir (pennant number RTOP-12) is a Kralj-class missile boat in service with the Croatian Navy. Like its sister ship Kralj Petar Krešimir IV, Kralj Dmitar Zvonimir features a mixture of Western and Eastern equipment including a Swedish forward gun and anti-ship missiles as well as Russian-built propulsion and close-in weapon system (CIWS).

Although the ship was laid down in 1993, it was not until 2001 it was launched and commissioned, still lacking complete armament. Even though they belong to the same class, Kralj Dmitar Zvonimir features slight changes compared to Kralj Petar Krešimir IV. These include an altered bridge, longer hull and digitalised control of the propulsion.
