= Mornar =

Mornar is a South Slavic occupational surname literally meaning "mariner", "sailor". Notable people with the surname include:

- Ivica Mornar
- Marin Mornar
- Matéo Mornar
- Vedran Mornar
