= Meleda, Vologda Oblast =

Meleda Меледа
- Village
- Location within Vologda Oblast Location within Russia
- Coordinates: 58°55′N 38°32′E
- Country: Russia
- Region: Vologda Oblast
- District: Cherepovetsky District
- Time zone: UTC+3:00

Meleda (Russian: Меледа) is a rural locality (a village) in Yugskoye Rural Settlement, Cherepovetsky District, Vologda Oblast, Russia. The population was 9 as of 2002.

== Geography ==
Meleda is located 53 km (33 mi) southeast of Cherepovets (the district's administrative centre) by road. Sychevo is the nearest rural locality.
