= MT-class motor torpedo boat =

Class overview
- Builders: Higgins Industries
- Operators: Yugoslav Navy
- In commission: 1944–1966
- Completed: 8
- Scrapped: 8

General characteristics
- Type: Sea-going motor torpedo boat
- Displacement: 54 t (53 long tons) (full load)
- Length: 23.93 m (78 ft 6 in)
- Beam: 6.12 m (20 ft 1 in)
- Draught: 1.6 m (5 ft 3 in)
- Installed power: 4,050 bhp (3,020 kW)
- Propulsion: 3 × shafts; 3 × petrol engines
- Speed: 39 knots (72 km/h; 45 mph)
- Range: 500 nmi (930 km; 580 mi) at 20 knots (37 km/h; 23 mph)
- Complement: 17
- Armament: 1 × 40 mm (1.6 in) gun; 2 × 20 mm (0.79 in) guns; 2 × twin 12.7 mm (0.50 in) machine guns; 2 × 7.62 mm (.30 in) machine guns; 4 × 570 mm (22.4 in) Mark 13 torpedoes

The MT class were eight motor torpedo boats that served with the Yugoslav Navy post-World War II. They were originally built for the United States Navy by Higgins Industries as patrol torpedo boats, and served in the Mediterranean Sea with them, before being transferred to the Royal Navy at Malta in late 1944. All survived the war to be taken over by the Yugoslav Navy, with one being deleted in 1955, and the rest struck off in 1966.

== Background ==
The United States Navy first became interested in motor torpedo boats (MTBs) in the mid-1930s, due to overseas developments in the type. The US Navy imported some British MTBs and developed prototypes of their own. Production patrol torpedo boat (PT boat) models were built from March 1942 onwards by a number of manufacturers, including Higgins Industries of New Orleans. Initial armament was four torpedo tubes and two twin 12.7-millimetre (0.50 in) machine gun mounts, although the tubes were replaced by racks, and the gun armament was progressively upgraded as the war continued. Production batches were generally in multiples of 12 boats, as this was the size of a US Navy Motor Torpedo Boat Squadron (MTBRon).

== Description and construction ==
Higgins built several batches of PT boats from the first "Maximum Effort Program" series contract signed on 25 March 1942, comprising PT197–PT254. This included PT201 –PT218, which were built in 1943. PT201–PT218 had a length overall of 23.93 m (78 ft 6 in), a beam of 6.12 m (20 ft 1 in) and a normal draught of 1.6 m (5 ft 3 in). While their designed displacement was 38 tonnes (37 long tons), they displaced 54 tonnes (53 long tons) fully loaded. The crew consisted of 17 officers and enlisted men. Their three petrol engines generated 4,050 brake horsepower (3,020 kW) driving three shafts, and the boats were designed to reach a top speed of 39 knots (72 km/h; 45 mph). They carried 11,000 litres (3,000 US gal) of fuel, which gave them a range of 500 nautical miles (930 km; 580 mi) at 20 knots (37 km/h; 23 mph).

During their service, their armament had been significantly enhanced, so that by August 1944, their gun armament consisted of one Bofors 40 mm (1.6 in) gun on the stern, and two Oerlikon 20 mm (0.79 in) guns, one on the bow and one just forward of the 40 mm mount. The two twin M2 Browning 12.7 mm machine gun mounts were located on either side of the bridge, and there were also two single Browning M1919 7.62-millimetre (.30 in) machine guns amidships. Four 571 mm (22.5 in) Mark 13 torpedoes were carried in racks, with two on either side, one amidships and one on the rear deck just forward of the rear gun.

== Service history ==
MTBRon 15 was commissioned on 20 January 1943. After fit-out and training of crews, MTBRon 15 was based in the Mediterranean Sea under the tactical control of British Royal Navy coastal forces. PT202 and PT218 were mined in August 1944, and the remaining boats of MTBRon 15, PT201, PT203–PT217, were transferred to the Royal Navy in October 1944. In August 1945, PT201, PT204, PT207–PT209, PT211, PT213 and PT217 were transferred to the Yugoslav Navy that had grown out of the maritime forces of the Yugoslav Partisans. They remained in service until 1966, except for one boat that was deleted in 1955. The boats were considered a successful type, and were copied by the Yugoslavs, who made 96 similar boats between 1951 and 1960.
