= Kraljevica =

- Town
- Grad Kraljevica; Town of Kraljevica
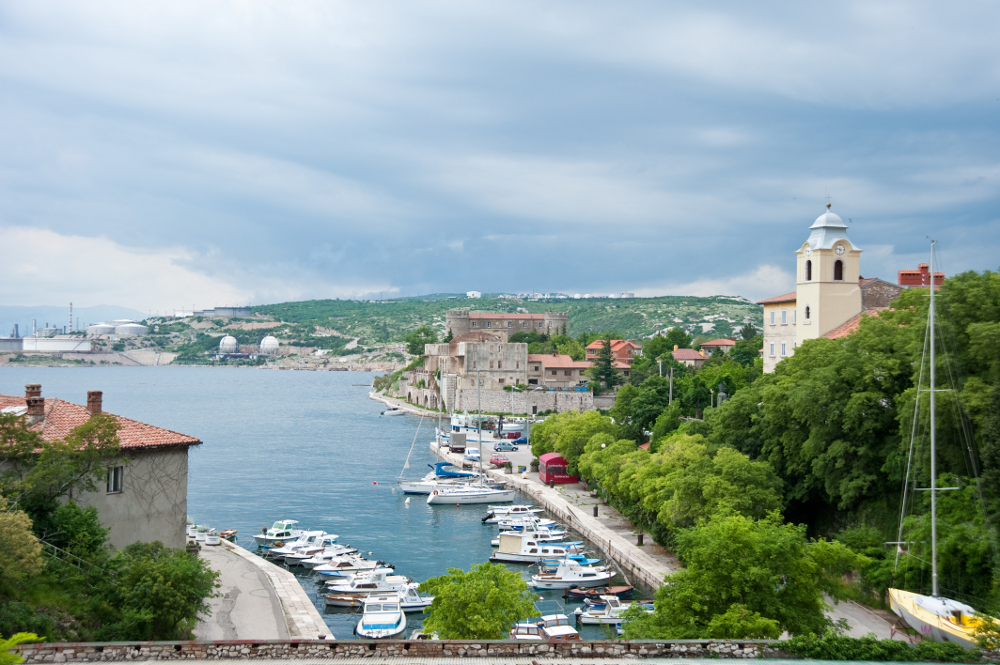
- View of Kraljevica
- Interactive map of Kraljevica
- Location within Croatia
- Coordinates: 45.274°N 14.568°E
- Country: Croatia
- Region: Central Croatia (Croatian Littoral)
- County: Primorje-Gorski Kotar County

Government
  - Mayor: Dalibor Čandrlić (HDZ)
  - City Council: 13 members: HDZ-HSLS (8); _; HNS-SDP-HSU-PGS-HSS-IDS (5)

Area
  - Town: 17.6 km^{2} (6.8 sq mi)
  - Urban: 5.6 km^{2} (2.2 sq mi)

Population (2021)
  - Town: 4,066
  - Density: 231/km^{2} (598/sq mi)
  - Urban: 2,415
  - Urban density: 430/km^{2} (1,100/sq mi)
- Time zone: UTC+1 (CET)
  - Summer (DST): UTC+2 (CEST)
- Website: kraljevica.hr

Kraljevica (known as Porto Re in Italian and literally translated as "King's cove" in English) is a town in the Kvarner region of western Croatia, located between Rijeka and Crikvenica, approximately thirty kilometers from Opatija and near the entrance to the bridge to the island of Krk. It is part of Primorje-Gorski Kotar County.

The town is known for its shipyard which has built a number of ships for the Croatian navy.

== History ==
Kraljevica is a town that was written about as early as the 13th century. Today, in addition to having the oldest shipyard on the Adriatic, Kraljevica's skyline is dominated by two medieval castles and a church of the Croatian nobles Zrinski and Frankopan. Kraljevica's shipyard employed Josip Broz Tito, the former leader of Yugoslavia, during the first half of the 20th century in his early years of organizing for the Communist Party. After he became marshal of Yugoslavia following World War II, the shipyard took his name, until democratic changes in the 1990s. Kraljevica was the site of an Italian-run concentration camp during WW II.

In March 1873, the Primorska štediona savings bank opened in Kraljevica. It competed with the savings bank in Bakar (established 1876), but had to file bankruptcy in 1878.

Today Kraljevica is also a popular tourist destination on the Adriatic coast. The Krk Bridge is located nearby, in the southeast part of the city.

== Climate ==
Between 1981 and 1986, the highest temperature recorded at the local weather station was 34.8 °C (94.6 °F), on 29 July 1983. The coldest temperature was −10.1 °C (13.8 °F), on 7 January 1985.

== Demographics ==
In the 2011 census, the total population of the township was 4,618, with the following settlements:

- Bakarac, population 287 ▼
- Kraljevica, population 2415 ▼
- Križišće, population 79 ▼
- Mali Dol, population 161 ▼
- Šmrika, population 963 ▼
- Veli Dol, population 161 ▼

In 1890, the obćina of Kraljevica (court at Kraljevica), with an area of 11.35 square kilometres (4.38 mi^{2}), belonged to the kotar of Sušak (Bakar court and electoral district) in the županija of Modruš-Rieka (Ogulin court and financial board). There were 403 houses, with a population of 1689. Its sole village for taxation purposes made up its own porezna obćina, under the Bakar office. The only statistical market in Sušak kotar was in Kraljevica.

Town of Kraljevica: Population trends 1857–2021
v

population	3120	3184	2839	3012	3240	3318	3987	3303	2917	3521	3435	3840	4254	4513	4579	4618	4066
	1857	1869	1880	1890	1900	1910	1921	1931	1948	1953	1961	1971	1981	1991	2001	2011	2021

Sources: Croatian Bureau of Statistics publications

== Governance ==
=== Local ===
It is the seat of its own local committee.

== Infrastructure ==
In 1913, there were two gendarmeries in Sušak kotar: Sušak and Kraljevica.
