= Kraljevica Shipyard =

Coordinates: 45.2706°N 14.5686°E

- Company type: Limited liability company
- Industry: Ship building
- Founded: 28 April 1729
- Founder: Charles VI, Holy Roman Emperor
- Headquarters: Kraljevica, Croatia
- Owner: Ivan Ivić
- Website: dalmont.hr

Kraljevica Shipyard is a shipbuilder at Kraljevica, on the Adriatic coast of Croatia. The shipyard was founded in 1729 by Charles VI, Holy Roman Emperor, and is claimed to be the oldest continuously operational shipyard in the world.

The shipyard has been operating under the name DALMONT d.o.o. since 1992. The government of Croatia has repeatedly attempted to privatise the shipyard, most recently in November 2010. The company was forced into bankruptcy proceedings by the Croatian government in March 2012.

== Vessels ==
The shipyard has produced a variety of commercial ships, military vessels, and superyachts. In 2009, Kraljevica Shipyard constructed the JoyMe, a 49.9 metre yacht. In 2010, the shipyard agreed to build two large trawlers for Russian clients.
