= List of submarine classes =

This is a list of submarine classes, sorted by country. The navies of 46 states operate submarines.

== Algeria ==
- Raïs Hadj Mubarek class (Type 877EKM Kilo)
- Raïs Hadj Slimane class (Type 877EKM Kilo)
- 2 Project 636 (in order)

== Albania ==
- Whiskey class

== Argentina ==
Armada de la República Argentina:

- Santa Fe class (1930s built in Italy — decommissioned)
- Santa Fe (1960s US-built Balao class - decommissioned)
- Santa Fe S-21 (1970s US-built GUPPY - decommissioned)
- Santa Cruz class (German-built TR-1700 - one remaining boat inactive)
- Salta class (German-built Type 209/1200 - inactive; one used for dockside training)

== Australia ==
Royal Australian Navy:

- Oberon class (decommissioned)
- Collins class (Type 471)

== Bangladesh ==
Bangladesh Navy:

- Ming class (Type 035/based on Romeo)

== Brazil ==
Brazilian Navy:

- Foca class (1913) - (decommissioned)
- Humaytá (1927) - (decommissioned)
- Tupi class (1937) - (decommissioned)
- Goiaz class (GUPPY III) (decommissioned)
- Bahia class (GUPPY II) (decommissioned)
- Humaita class (Oberon class) (decommissioned)
- Tupi class (Type 209/1400)
- Tikuna (modified Tupi class) (modified Type 209/1400)
- Riachuelo class (modified Scorpéne class)
- SSN being developed with French help

== Bulgaria ==
- Slava class (Romeo acquired from the USSR)

== Canada ==
Royal Canadian Navy:

- Victoria-class submarine - 4 ex-RN Upholder-class in active service
- Oberon-class submarine (decommissioned after 2000); 3 acquired and 2 for training and spares; 2 sold as museum ship (HMCS Ojibwa (S72) and HMCS Onondaga (S73)) and 3 scrapped (HMS Olympus (S12), HMS Osiris (S13), HMCS Okanagan (S74))
- Tench-class submarine (decommissioned); built for United States Navy; USS Argonaut (SS-475) renamed HMCS Rainbow 1968 and retired 1974
- Balao-class submarine (decommissioned); built for United States Navy; USS Burrfish (SS-312) acquired 1961 and renamed as HMCS Grisle and served until 1969; return to USN and later scrapped.
- British H-class submarine (decommissioned); built in United States; acquired 1919 HMCS CH-14 and HMCS CH-15 and disposed 1927 and 1922 respectively
- CC-class submarine (decommissioned); built in United States for Chilean Navy and sold to British Columbia 1913; CC-1 and CC-2 Commissioned Royal Canadian Navy 1914; scrapped in 1920

=== Captured and recommissioned German U-boats ===
- Captured and recommissioned German U-boats - German Type IX submarines German submarine U-190 and German submarine U-889

== Chile ==
- Capitan O'Brien class - built in Britain in late 1920s
- O'Brien class (Oberon class) (decommissioned)
- Thomson class (Type 209/1400) (upgraded)
- O'Higgins class (Scorpène)

== People's Republic of China ==
People's Liberation Army Navy:

- Type 03 class (Whiskey) (decommissioned)
- Type 031 class (Golf) (SSB)
- Type 033 class (Romeo)
- Wuhan class (Type 033G, license built Romeo)
- Ming class (Type 035/based on Romeo)
- Kilo class
- Song class (Type 039)
- Yuan class (Type 041)
- Han class (Type 091) (SSN)
- Xia class (Type 092) (SSBN)
- Shang class (Type 093) (SSN)
- Jin class (Type 094) (SSBN)

== Colombia ==
- Pijao class (Type 209/1200)
- Intrepide class (Italian midget submarine Type SX 506)

== Croatia ==
- modified Una-class midget submarine

== Cuba ==
- Foxtrot class
- Whisky class (Never exported)
- Delfin Midget Submarine

== Denmark ==
Royal Danish Navy:

- D class (1926—1946)
- H class (1938—1950)
- U class (1947—1959)
- V class (1947—1958)
- Delfinen class (1961—1990)
- Narhvalen class (Type 205) (1970—2004)
- Tumleren class (Kobben/Type 207) (1989—2004)
- Kronborg class (Näcken) (2001—2004)

== Ecuador ==
- Shyri class (Type 209/1300) (upgraded)

== Estonia ==
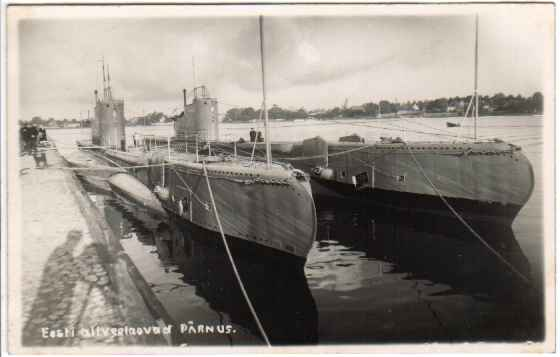
Kalev class submarines.

Kalev class mine laying submarines

Estonian Navy:

- EML Kalev (1936)
- EML Lembit

== Egypt ==
- Romeo class (Chinese built, Type 033G?)
- Type 209 submarine 2 ordered

== Finland ==
Finnish Navy:

- Vesikko (World War II)
- Saukko (World War II)
- Vetehinen (World War II)

== France ==
Marine Nationale:

- List of French submarines

== Germany ==
Kaiserliche Marine:

- Type U-1 U-boat
- Type U-2 U-boat
- Type U-3 U-boat
- Type U-5 U-boat
- Type U-9 U-boat
- Type U-13 U-boat
- Type U-16 U-boat
- Type U-17 U-boat
- Type U-19 U-boat
- Type U-23 U-boat
- Type U-27 U-boat
- Type U-31 U-boat
- Type U-43 U-boat
- Type U-51 U-boat
- Type U-57 U-boat
- Type U-63 U-boat
- Type U-66 (Type UD) U-boat
- Type U-81 U-boat
- Type U-87 U-boat
- Type U-93 U-boat
- Type U-127 U-boat
- Type U-139 U-boat
- Type U-142 U-boat
- Type U-151 U-boat
- Type UA U-boat
- Type UB I U-boat
- Type UB II U-boat
- Type UB III U-boat
- Type UC I U-boat
- Type UC II U-boat
- Type UC III U-boat
- Type UE I U-boat
- Type UE II U-boat

Kriegsmarine:

- Type I U-boat
- Type II U-boat
- Type VII U-boat
- Type IX U-boat
- Type X U-boat
- Type XIV U-boat
- Type XVII U-boat
- Type XVIII U-boat
- Type XXI U-boat
- Type XXIII U-boat

Modern German Navy:

- Type 240 class (Type XXIII) (decommissioned)
- Type 241 class (Type XXI) (decommissioned)
- Type 201 class (decommissioned)
- Type 202 class (decommissioned)
- Type 205 class (decommissioned)
- Type 206A class (decommissioned)
- Type 212A class

Export Models:

- Gal class (design only)
- Type 207 class (Kobben)
- Type 209 class
- TR-1700 class
- Type 210 class (Ula)
- Dolphin class
- Type 214 class

== Greece ==
Hellenic Navy

- Katsonis-class submarine
- Protefs-class submarine
- Glavkos class (Type 209/1100)
- Poseidon class (Type 209/1200)
- Katsonis class (Type 214)

== India ==
Indian Navy (list):

- Kalari (Foxtrot) Class (retired)
- Vela (Foxtrot) Class (retired)
- Shishumar (Type 209) Class (operational)
- Sindhughosh (Kilo) Class (operational)
- Kalvari (Scorpène) Class (operational)
- Akula Class (retired)
- Arihant Class (operational)

== Indonesia ==
Indonesian Navy:

- Cakra class (Type 209/1300)
- Nagapasa class (Improved Jang Bogo class)
- Scorpène class

== Iran ==
Iranian Navy:

- Kilo class
- Ghadir class
- Fateh class
- Nahang class
- Ghaaem class

== Israel ==
Israeli Navy:

- Gal class
- Dolphin class

== Italy ==
Regia Marina:

- Balilla class
- Medusa class
- Laurenti class
- Cavallini class
- Archimede class
- 600 Serie Adua class submarine
- Marcello class
- Marconi class
- Fieramosca class
- Glauco class
- Brin class
- Foca class

Marina Militare:

- Toti class (decommissioned)
- Nazario Sauro class
- Salvatore Pelosi class (improved Sauro)
- Primo Longobardo class (improved Pelosi)
- Salvatore Todaro class (Type 212A)

== Japan ==
=== Imperial Japanese Navy ===
- Ko-hyoteki class submarine (midget)
- Kaidai 1 class (aka I-51)
- Kaidai 2 class (a.k.a. I-152)
- Kaidai 3a, 3b class (a.k.a. I-153 and I-156)
- Kaidai 4 class (a.k.a. I-162)
- Kaidai 5 class (a.k.a. I-165)
- Kaidai 6a, 6b class (a.k.a. I-168 and I-174)
- Kaidai 7 class (a.k.a. I-176)
- Junsen J1 class (a.k.a. I-1 class)
- Junsen J2 class (a.k.a. I-6)
- Junsen J3 class (a.k.a. I-7)
- Junsen A1 class (a.k.a. I-9)
- Junsen A2 class (a.k.a. I-12)
- Junsen A Modified class (a.k.a. I-13)
- Junsen B1 class (a.k.a. I-15 series)
- Junsen B2 class (a.k.a. I-40)
- Junsen B3 class (a.k.a. I-54)
- Junsen C1 class (a.k.a. I-16)
- Junsen C2 class (a.k.a. I-46)
- Junsen C3 class (a.k.a. I-52)
- Sen Toku class (a.k.a. I-400)
- Sen Taka Dai class (a.k.a. I-200)
- Kiraisen class (a.k.a. I-121)
- Senho class (a.k.a. I-351)
- D1 class (a.k.a. I-361)
- D2 class (a.k.a. I-373)
- Kaichū class
- Kaishō class (a.k.a. Ro-100)
- Sen Taka Sho class (a.k.a. Ha-201)
- LA class

=== Japan Maritime Self-Defense Force ===
- United States Gato-class:Kuroshio was commissioned on August 15, 1955, and stricken on March 31, 1966. The first Japanese Maritime Self Defense Force submarine.
- Oyashio (SS-511): A single unit, launched on May 25, 1959, and stricken on September 30, 1976. The first indigenous submarine of the Japanese Maritime Self Defense Force.
- Hayashio class
- Natsushio class
- Oshio class
- Uzushio class
- Yushio class
- Harushio class
- Asashio class (modified Harushio to test Stirling AIP System)
- Oyashio class
- Sōryū class
- Taigei class

== Republic of Korea ==
Republic of Korea Navy:

- Dolgorae class (decommissioned)
- Jang Bogo class (Type 209)
- Sohn Won-yil class (Type 214)
- Dosan Ahn Changho class

== North Korea ==
Korean People's Army:

- Whiskey class (decommissioned?)
- Romeo class
- Sang-O class
- Yugo class (midget submarine)
- Sinpo class

== Libya ==
- Foxtrot (non operational)

== Malaysia ==
Royal Malaysian Navy:

- Agosta 70 class (decommissioned)
- Perdana Menteri class (Scorpène)

== Myanmar ==
Myanmar Navy:

- Kilo class

== Netherlands ==
Royal Dutch Navy:

- K XI class (decommissioned)
- Walrus (old) class (GUPPY IB) (decommissioned)
- Zwaardvis (old) class (T-class) (decommissioned)
- Dolfijn class (decommissioned)
- Potvis class (enhanced Dolfijn) (decommissioned)
- Zwaardvis class (decommissioned)
- Walrus class

== Norway ==
Royal Norwegian Navy:

- Kobben (1909–1933) One vessel built in Germany.
- A class (1913–1940) Three vessels bought from Germany.
- B class (1922–1946) Six vessels of the U.S. Holland type built under licence in Norway.
- U class (1941–1943) One vessels given to Norway in 1941.
- V class (1949-196X) Two vessels given to Norway in 1943, after the war Norway purchased three more.
- K class (1949–1961) Three vessels left in Norway by the Germans.
- Kobben / Type 207 (1964–2003) Fifteen vessels purchased from Germany.
- Ula / Type 210 (1989-In use) Six vessels purchased from Germany.

== Pakistan ==
- Agosta class
- Ghazi (formerly USS Diablo (SS-479))
- Hangor class

== Peru ==
- Abato class (decommissioned)
- Casma class (Type 209/1200)

== Poland ==
Polish Navy:

- Wilk class (3 decommissioned)
- Orzeł class (1 sunk, 1 decommissioned)
- S-1 class (1 sunk)
- U class (2 decommissioned)
- Malyutka class (6 decommissioned)
- Whiskey class (4 decommissioned)
- Foxtrot class (2 decommissioned)
- Kilo class (1 in service)
- Kobben / Type 207 class (4 decommissioned)

== Portugal ==
Portuguese Navy:

- Espadarte
- Foca class (Italian F class)
- British S class
- Delfim class
- Albacora class (Daphné class)
- Cachalote
- Delfim II
- Tridente class (Type 214)

== Romania ==
- Delfinul class (Kilo - inactive)
- Dalfinul class (World War II)
- Rechinul class
- Marsuinul class
- CB class

== Russia (and Soviet Union) ==
Soviet Navy and Russian Navy:

- See the list of Soviet and Russian submarine classes

== Singapore ==
Republic of Singapore Navy:

- Challenger class (refurbished Swedish Sjöormen class)
- Archer class (originally Swedish Västergötland class, upgraded to Södermanland class standards) (commission planned for 2010)

== South Africa ==
South African Navy:

- Maria van Riebeeck/Spear class (Daphné)
- Heroine class Type 209/1400-mod

== Spain ==
Spanish Navy:

- Peral
- Isaac Peral (A-0) (Laurenti)
- A class (Laurenti)
- B class (Holland F-105)
- C class (Holland F-105F)
- D class
- General Mola class (Archimede)
- G class (Type VII C)
- Foca class (Spanish version of the Seehund)
- Tiburón class
- Almirante García de los Reyes class (Balao)
- Serie 30 class (Guppy IIA)
- Delfín class (Daphné)
- Galerna class (Agosta)
- S-80 Plus class (in construction)

Export models:

- Gür (E) class
- Scorpene class

== Syria ==
- Romeo class

== Sweden ==
Swedish Navy:

- Hajen class
- Draken class
- Sjöormen class
- Näcken class (Type A-14)
- Västergötland class (Type A-17)
- Södermanland class (upgraded Västergötland)
- Gotland class (Type A-19)
- Blekinge class (Type A-26)

== Taiwan ==
Republic of China Navy:

- Hai Lung class (Zwaardvis-class submarine) class
- Hai Shih class (Tench class) class

== Thailand ==
Royal Thai Navy:

- Matchanu class - 1938–1951

== Turkey ==
Turkish Navy:

- Atilay class (Type 209/1200)
- Preveze class (Type 209T1/1400)
- Gur class (Type 209T2/1400)
- Type 214TN (advanced Type 214)

== United Kingdom ==
Royal Navy:

- Holland class
- A class
- B class
- C class
- D class
- E class
- F class
- G class
- H class
- J class
- L class
- K class
- M class
- Nautilus class
- R class
- HMS X1
- Odin class
- Parthian class
- Rainbow class
- S class
- River class
- Grampus class
- T class
- U class
- P611 class
- V class
- Amphion class
- HMS Meteorite
- Explorer class
- Stickleback class (midget submarines)
- Porpoise class (Diesel-electric hunter-killer)
- Oberon class (Diesel-electric hunter-killer)
- HMS Dreadnought (S101)
- Valiant class attack submarines
- Resolution class ballistic missile submarines
- Churchill class attack submarines
- Swiftsure class attack submarines
- Trafalgar class attack submarines
- Upholder class attack submarines
- Vanguard class SSBN submarines
- Astute class attack submarines

== Ukraine ==
Ukrainian Navy:

- Kherson class (Foxtrot)

== Venezuela ==
- Sabalo-class (Type 209/1300)

== Vietnam ==
- Kilo class
- Yugo class

== Yugoslavia ==
- Hrabri-class submarine
- Osvetnik-class submarine
- Sutjeska-class submarine
- Sava class submarine
- Heroj-class submarine
- Una-class midget submarine
