= German submarine UA =

Two submarines of Germany have borne the name UA:

- SM UA, a Norwegian A-class submarine launched in May 1914 as HNoMS A-5 and seized by Germany in August 1914. She was surrendered at the end of World War I and sold for scrap but sank en route to the breakers.
- German submarine UA (1939) an Ay-class submarine launched in 1938 as TCG Batiray she was seized and renamed UA by Germany in 1939. She was scuttled in 1945

== See also ==
- German Type UA submarine
