= HNoMS Kobben =

At least two ships of the Royal Norwegian Navy have been named HNoMS Kobben:

- HNoMS Kobben (1909), the first Norwegian submarine launched in 1909 and scrapped in 1933.
- HNoMS Kobben (S182), the German Type 201 submarine U-3, which was loaned to the Norwegian Navy between 10 July 1962 and 20 June 1964 in order to familiarize them with the upcoming fifteen ordered U-boats of the Kobben-class submarines
- HNoMS Kobben (S318), a Kobben-class submarine commissioned in 1964 and transferred to Poland in 2002 as a source of spares, subsequently used for crew training
