= Croatian submarine Velebit =

Croatian Una-class submarine

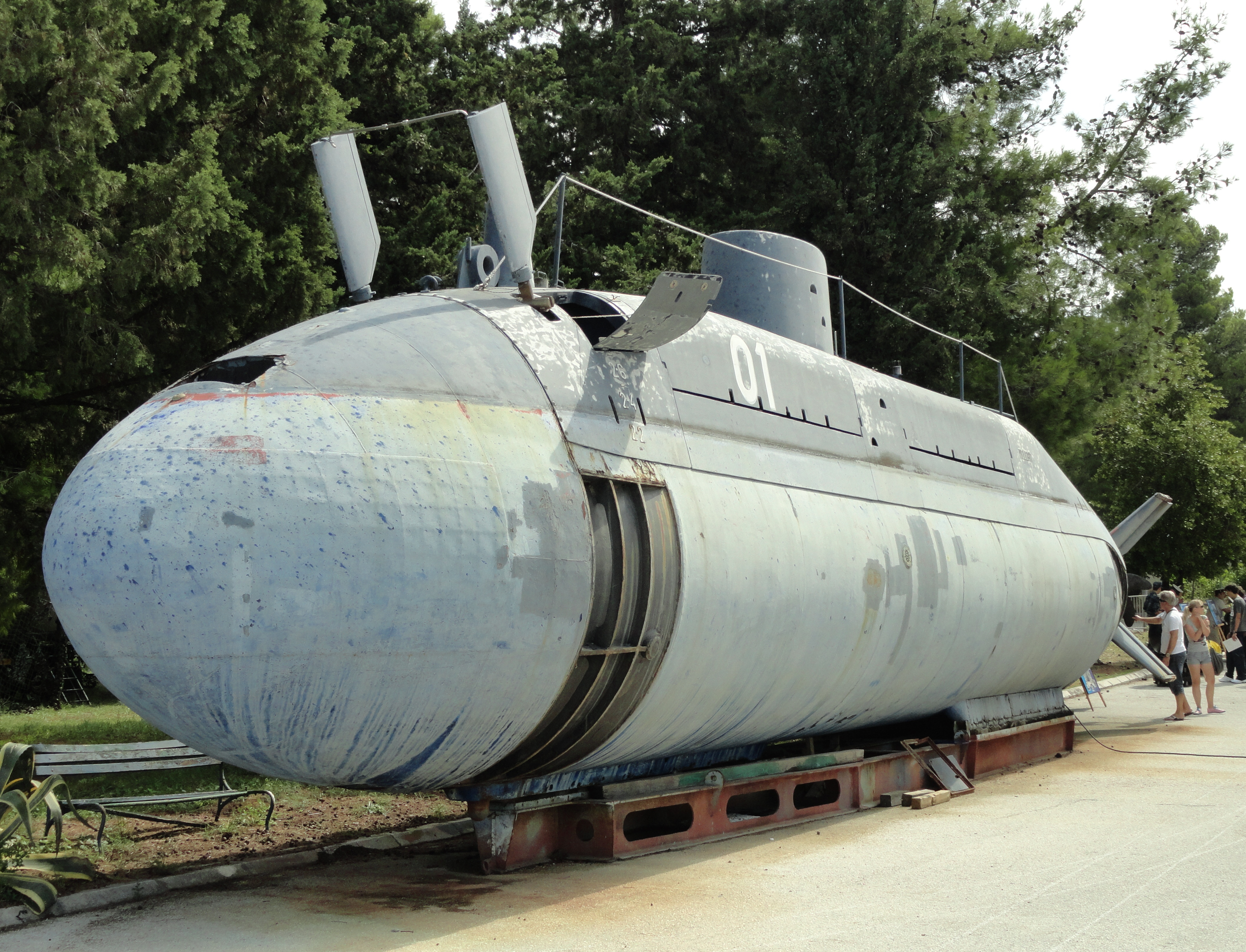
- Velebit in the Lora Naval Base, August 2011

History

Yugoslavia
- Name: Soča
- Builder: Brodogradilište specijalnih objekata, Split
- Homeport: Lora Naval Base, Split
- Identification: P-914
- Captured: 1991
- Fate: Captured by the Croatian National Guard during an overhaul

Croatia
- Name: Velebit
- Acquired: 1991
- Out of service: 2005
- Renamed: 1996
- Refit: 1996
- Stricken: 2006
- Homeport: Lora Naval Base, Split
- Identification: P-01
- Fate: Raised from the sea and stored in Lora Naval Base, declared redundant

General characteristics
- Displacement: Surfaced: 88 tonnes (87 long tons); Submerged: 98.5 tonnes (96.9 long tons)
- Length: 21.09 m (69.2 ft)
- Beam: 2.7 m (8.9 ft)
- Draft: 2.4 m (7.9 ft)
- Propulsion: 2 × 20 kW electric motors; 1 × 105 kW diesel generator
- Range: 250 nmi (460 km; 290 mi) at 4 knots (7.4 km/h; 4.6 mph)
- Endurance: 6–7 days
- Crew: 4 + 6 special forces
- Armament: 4 × R-1 swimmer delivery vehicles; 4 × AIM-70 bottom mines

Velebit (pennant number P-01) was a modified Una-class midget submarine and the only submarine to see service with the Croatian Navy. It was built for the Yugoslav Navy during the 1980s where it was named Soča. At the outbreak of the Croatian War of Independence Soča was being overhauled in the Brodogradilište specijalnih objekata division of Brodosplit shipyard in Split, Croatia. Although stripped of all equipment, it was preserved from the retreating Yugoslav forces by the shipyard workers.

With modifications that were aimed at improving the ships endurance by including a diesel generator, it was launched as Velebit (P-01) in 1996. Since 2001, due to battery set malfunction, Velebit was no longer able to submerge, and was constrained to surface operations. After it was decommissioned in 2006, there were unsuccessful attempts of selling it to a foreign buyer. The submarine was then offered to various museums in Croatia, with a final destination still pending.

== Design and construction ==
Velebit was completed as Soča in 1987 at the Brodogradilište specijalnih objekata division of Brodosplit shipyard in Split, Croatia, as the fourth boat in its class. It measures 21.09 metres (69.2 feet) in length, has a draft of 2.4 m (7.9 ft), a 2.7 m (8.9 ft) beam and displaces 88 tonnes (87 long tons) when surfaced or 98.5 tonnes (96.9 long tons) when submerged. It was constructed as a single hull design with the internal compartment divided into three sections: forward (command/steering) position, exit chamber and the propulsion section in the back. During underwater operations two battery groups with a total of 256 cells power two 20 kW Končar electric motors mounted on a single shaft that spins a five blade propeller. Surface propulsion and battery recharging is provided by a single diesel generator.

Maximum speed is eight knots (15 kilometres per hour; 9.2 miles per hour) underwater and seven knots (13 kilometres per hour; 8.1 miles per hour) surfaced. The boat's range is 250 nautical miles (460 kilometres; 290 miles) with a speed of four knots (7.4 kilometres per hour; 4.6 miles per hour). It has an underwater endurance of up to 6–7 days which is an improvement compared to 96 hours of other Una-class boats. Maximum diving depth is 120 metres (390 ft).

Because the class was designed with reconnaissance, small scale minelaying and special operations in mind, it does not possess any offensive weapons such as torpedoes. The submarine was to use its small dimensions to easily maneuver in the relatively shallow waters of the Adriatic Sea, staying undetected and transporting up to six special forces personnel who had 6–12 limpet mines and four AIM-M70 (M70/1) bottom mines or four R-1 submersibles at their disposal. Velebit had a crew of four.

== Service ==
Before the Croatian War of Independence Velebit served with the 88th Submarine Flotilla of the Yugoslav Navy entering service during the late 1980s. Velebit, then named Soča, was like other Una-class submarines, named after rivers in Yugoslavia. In 1991, it was being overhauled in Brodogradilište specijalnih objekata until the beginning of the war, when Croatian forces captured it. In 1993, Brodarski Institut (BI) of Zagreb started a modification program to improve the operational capabilities of the submarine captured two years earlier. The hull was lengthened by 1.40 m (4 ft 7 in) to create space needed for the installation of a single MTU 105 kW diesel generator, a feature the original Una-class design lacked. A new steering system developed by BI was also installed.

It was recommissioned as Velebit in 1996. According to the 2007 edition of The Naval Institute Guide to Combat Fleets of the World, Velebit was fitted with a STN-Atlas Elektronik PP-10 active and PSU-1-2 passive sonar and a portable navigational radar may have been used on board along with the GPS. The claim is contradicted by other sources with news reports stating the submarine was completed without an active sonar, effectively being "blind" underwater. During the 1990s Velebit had the pennant number "3" painted on its side. Since 2001, after the existing battery set needed for underwater propulsion expired and needed replacement, crew training and boat operations were limited to surface drives.

== Decommissioning and aftermath ==
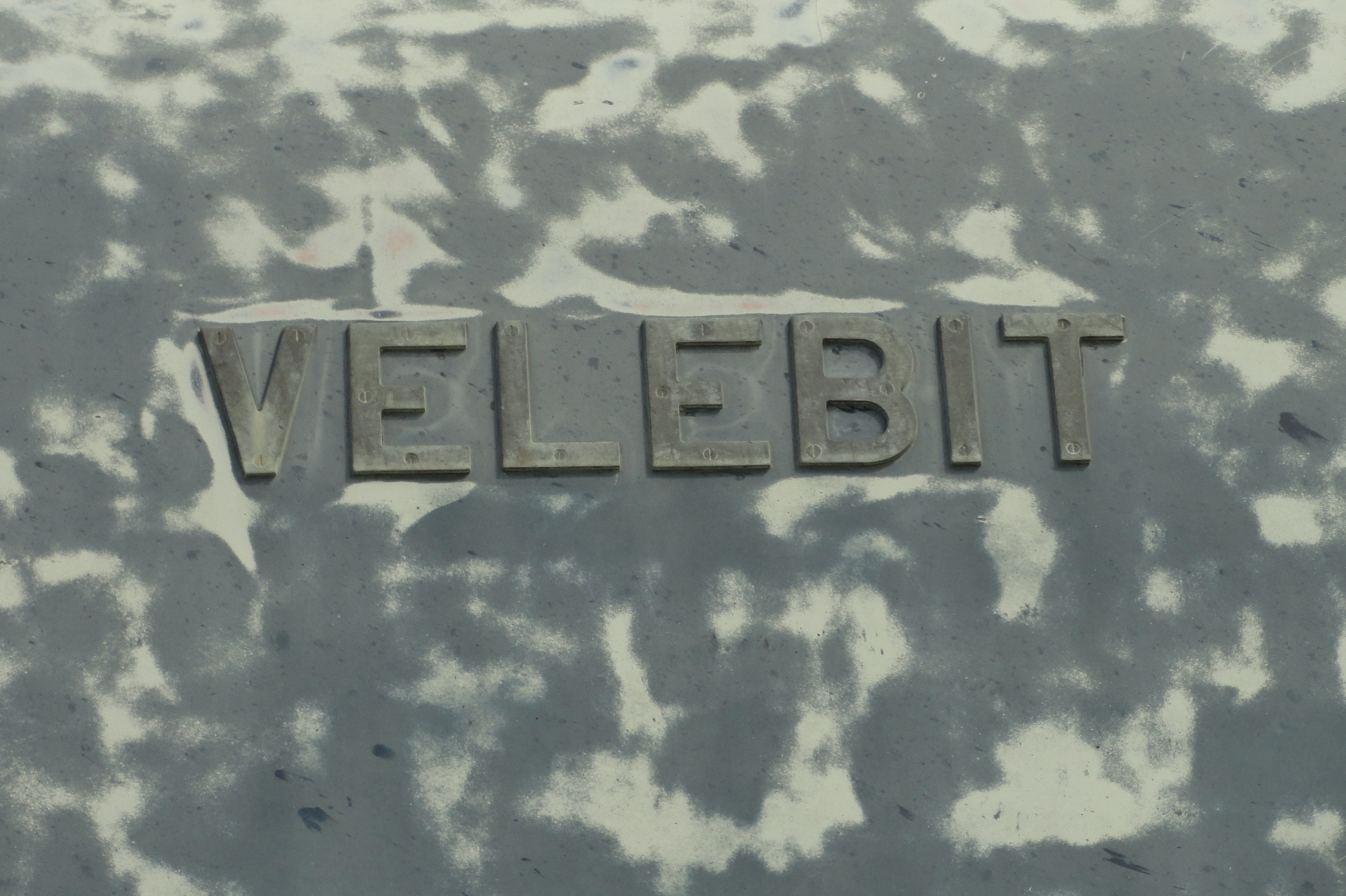
The boat's name on the port side of the hull

In February 2005 Velebit was raised from the sea, placed on a small platform within the Lora Naval Base and has remained there since. In June 2006 the Croatian Ministry of Defence released the Croatian Armed Forces Long Term Development Plan 2006–2015 (Croatian: Dugoročni plan razvoja Oružanih snaga Republike Hrvatske 2006–2015) in which it was stated that:

The HRM [Croatian Navy] does not possess anti-submarine warfare capabilities. It possesses one submarine which is not operationally usable. It's designed for offensive minelaying and transporting underwater special forces. The Armed Forces of Croatia will not keep its submarine capabilities and the submarine will be decommissioned.

– Croatian Armed Forces Long Term Development Plan 2006–2015

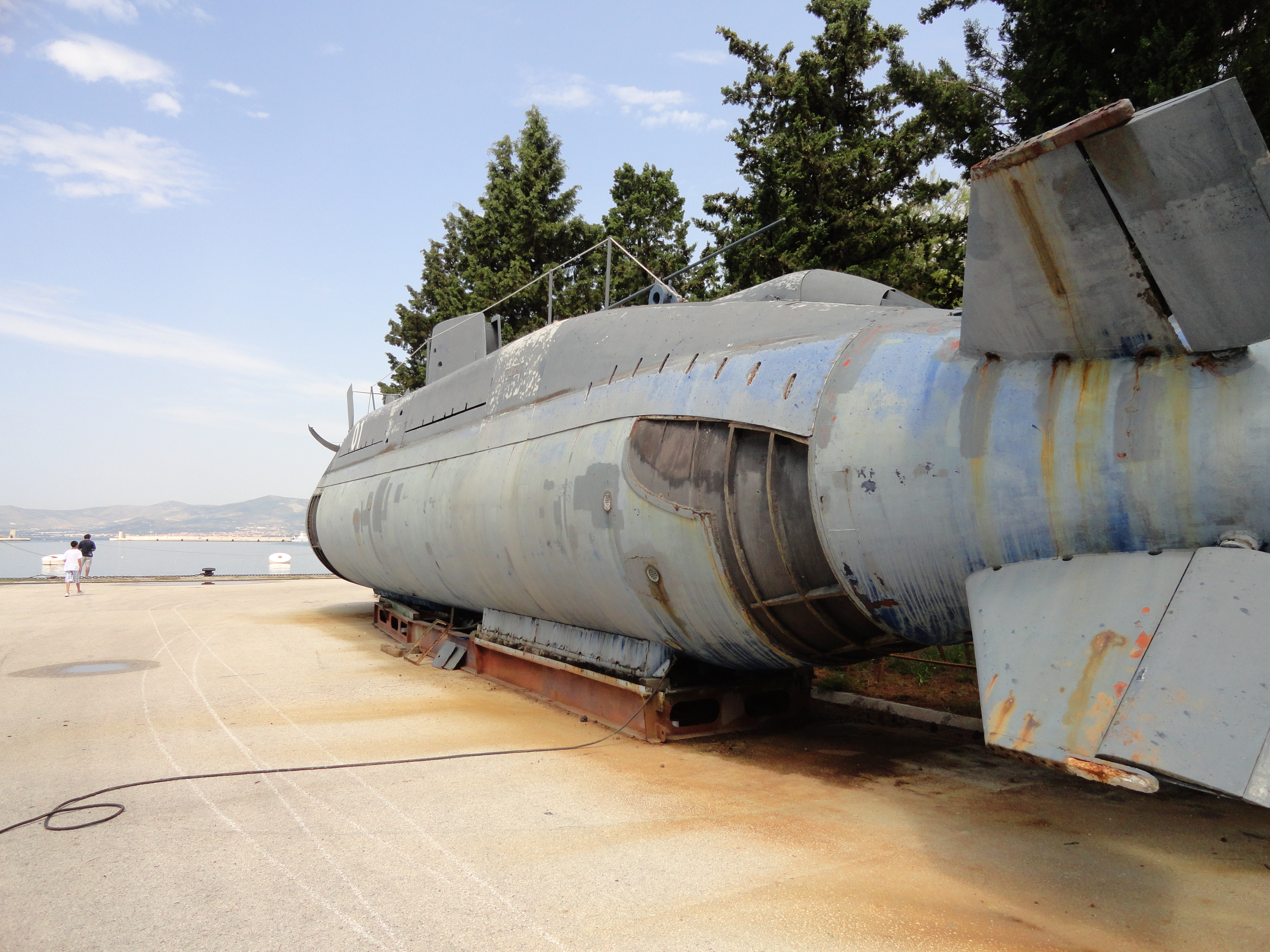
Velebit photographed in the Lora Naval Base in August 2011

The defence minister at the time, Berislav Rončević, explained that because Croatia was to join NATO in the spring 2008, it would be a part of the collective defense of the entire alliance, and the need to develop all aspects of the defence system, including a submarine force, would be unnecessary. In 2007 it was confirmed that the submarine was put up for sale through the state-owned "Alan Agency" that deals with weapons sales, with a starting price of 8 million Croatian kunas (approximately 1.07 million Euros). Acting commander of the Croatian Navy at the time, Ante Urlić, among other propositions, mentioned the possibility of installing a new set of batteries, sonar and overhauling the submarine. Fully operational, Velebit would then be sold for a much higher price of around 15 million euros. Considering the potential overhaul and sale didn't happen, a decision was made to donate the submarine to a museum.

In 2009 it appeared that the submarine would be given to the Technical Museum in Zagreb under an agreement between mayor Milan Bandić and the government agencies, but this project was canceled due to the difficulty of transporting the 4.42 metres (14.5 feet) tall submarine through the city center to the museum. The Croatian Maritime Museum in Split also expressed interest in obtaining Velebit as a part of its display, especially considering it was built in Split and homeported in the city throughout its service career. The main obstacle to this option is that the Maritime Museum is located in the Gripe fortress; because the plans for moving the Maritime Museum to the more spacious port of Split have been put on hold, a new option that includes moving Velebit to the Military Museum that's being created in Zagreb, has also appeared. As of 2018, the final location has yet to be decided.

== See also ==
- List of ships of the Yugoslav Navy
