= Pivka Park of Military History =

Military museum in Pivka, Slovenia

Coordinates: 45°40′4.34″N 14°11′19.99″E

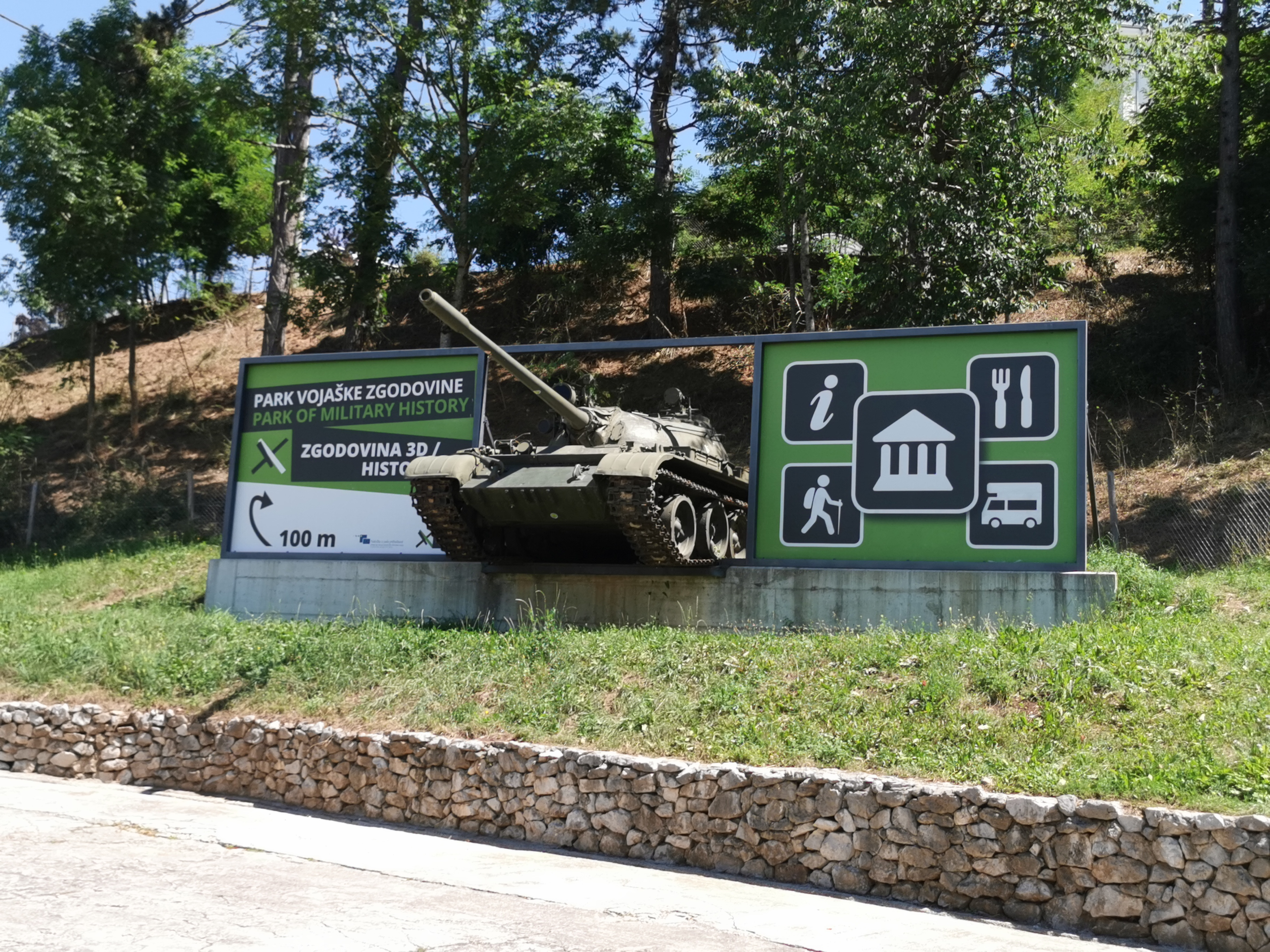
Advertisement for the Pivka Military History Park with a real tank

The Pivka Park of Military History (Slovene: Park vojaške zgodovine Pivka) is a military museum in the town in Pivka, Slovenia. It is operated jointly by the Municipality of Pivka and the Military Museum of the Slovene Armed Forces.

The museum's exhibits mainly date from the late WWII era and the Cold War, the timeframe of the former Socialist Federal Republic of Yugoslavia. The core collection consists of a large number of armored vehicles and artillery; there is also a small aviation collection, with five fixed-wing aircraft and two helicopters. The museum's most popular exhibit is the Zeta, an ex-Yugoslav Una-class infiltration submarine.

== History ==
The complex was built by the Italian army as a frontier barracks during the interwar period, when much of what is presently southwestern Slovenia was part of the Kingdom of Italy. A fortress of the Alpine Wall, built to guard the Italian side of the pre-1941 Rapallo border, is an annex of the museum grounds and is accessible by hiking trail. After WWII, the Pivka barracks were successively inherited by the militaries of Yugoslavia and Slovenia. In 2004, the facility was transferred from the Slovene Ministry of Defense to the Municipality of Pivka, with the understanding that it would be converted into a military museum. The initial exhibit (the tank and artillery pavilion, with exhibits transferred from the Military Museum of the Slovene Armed Forces) opened in September 2006.

== Exhibits ==
Exhibit	Origin	Manufactured	Role	Notes
Combat aircraft
Supermarine Spitfire F.IX	United Kingdom	1943	fighter	partial wreckage of Royal Air Force fighter, salvaged from the Ljubljana Marsh in 2019
F-84G Thunderjet	United States	1953	fighter-bomber	Ex-Yugoslav Air Force, supplied to Yugoslavia after the 1948 Tito-Stalin split. Acquired 2013; the museum's first fixed-wing aircraft placed on display. Formerly a gate guard at Brnik airport.
IF-86D Sabre	United States	late 1950s	reconnaissance aircraft/ fighter	Ex-Yugoslav Air Force, supplied to Yugoslavia after the 1948 Tito-Stalin split. Uncommon Yugoslav-modified reconnaissance variant. Acquired 2014; formerly a gate guard at Brnik airport.
MiG-21 / Aero S-106	Soviet Union / (Czechoslovak Socialist Republic) Czechoslovakia	1965	fighter	Ex-Czechoslovak Air Force. License-built version of the MiG-21. Acquired 2011.
IAR-93 Vultur	(Socialist Republic of Romania) Romania / Yugoslavia	1980s	fighter-bomber	Ex-Romanian Air Force. Joint design with Yugoslav SOKO J-22 Orao. Acquired 2014; gift of Romania.
Trainer aircraft
Soko 522	Yugoslavia	late 1950s	advanced trainer/ light attack	Ex-Yugoslav Air Force. Unrestored.
Utva 66	Yugoslavia	late 1960s	STOL/ utility trainer for J-20 Kraguj/paratroopers/ light attack	Ex-Letalski center Maribor remote located at LJCE airport inside the Air Base
UTVA Aero 3	Yugoslavia	late 1950s	basic trainer	Ex-Yugoslav Air Force. Unrestored.
Drones
C-Astral Belin	Slovenia	2010s	tactical reconnaissance UAV	Example of first commercially-produced Slovene military drone
Helicopters
Soko Gazela	France / Yugoslavia	1979	utility	TO-001 VELENJE. Ex-Yugoslav Air Force, ex-Slovenian Air Force. License-built Yugoslav version of the Aérospatiale Gazelle. Acquired 2012; Slovenia's first military aircraft, the pilots having defected from the Yugoslav Air Force during the Ten-Day War.
Mil Mi-8	Soviet Union		transport	Ex-Polish Air Force. Acquired 2019 in a barter arrangement with the Military Museum of the Polish Armed Forces.
Agusta-Bell AB 212	United StatesItaly	1980	police	S5-HPB ex-Slovenian National Police Force. Acquired 2022 upon retirement.
Maritime
Una-class	Yugoslavia / (Socialist Republic of Croatia) Croatia	1987	special-operations submarine	P-913 Zeta. Ex-Yugoslav Navy, ex-Montenegrin Navy. Acquired 2011; gift of Montenegro.
Avionautica police speedboat	Italy	1994	fast patrol boat	P-111. Ex-Slovene Police. Acquired 2021.
Tanks
M3 Stuart	United States	1940s	light tank	Ex-Yugoslav People's Army, First Partisan Tank Brigade. Supplied to Yugoslav resistance forces during WWII. Examples of M3A1 and M3A3 variants.
M4A3 Sherman	United States	1940s	medium tank	Ex-Yugoslav People's Army, supplied to Yugoslav resistance forces during WWII.
T-34-85	Soviet Union	1940s	medium tank	Ex-Yugoslav People's Army, Second Partisan Tank Brigade. Supplied to Yugoslav resistance forces during WWII.
SU-100	Soviet Union	1940s	tank destroyer	Ex-Yugoslav People's Army.
M47 Patton	United States	early 1950s	main battle tank	Ex-Yugoslav People's Army.
M36 Jackson	United States	1944	tank destroyer	Ex-Yugoslav People's Army.
T-55	Soviet Union	1950s	main battle tank	Ex-Yugoslav People's Army.
PT-76	Soviet Union	1950s–60s	amphibious light tank	Ex-Yugoslav People's Army.
T-72	Soviet Union	1970s	main battle tank	Ex-Yugoslav People's Army.
M-84	Yugoslavia	1980s	main battle tank	Ex-Yugoslav People's Army. Improved Yugoslav-built variant of the Soviet T-72.
Armored Personnel Carriers
M8	United States	1940s	armored car	Ex-Yugoslav People's Army, supplied to Yugoslav resistance forces during WWII.
M3A1 Scout Car	United States	1940s	armored car	Ex-Yugoslav People's Army, supplied to Yugoslav resistance forces during WWII.
Bren Gun Carrier	United Kingdom	1940s	armored personnel carrier	Ex-Yugoslav People's Army, First Partisan Tank Brigade. Supplied to Yugoslav resistance forces during WWII.
BMP-1	Soviet Union	1970s–80s	infantry fighting vehicle	Ex-Yugoslav People's Army.
BVP M-80A	Yugoslavia	1980s	armored personnel carrier	Ex-Yugoslav People's Army.
BOV	Yugoslavia / (Socialist Republic of Slovenia) Slovenia	1980s	armored personnel carrier	Ex-Yugoslav People's Army. Examples of military and police (BOV M-86) variants.
BTR-80	Soviet Union	late 1980s	armored personnel carrier	Ex-Yugoslav People's Army.
Artillery
Schneider MLE 1937	France	1930s	anti-tank gun	Ex-Royal Yugoslav Army, ex-Yugoslav People's Army.
Bofors gun	Sweden United States United Kingdom	1930s	anti-aircraft autocannon	Ex-Yugoslav People's Army.
Flak 30	(Nazi Germany) Germany	1940s	anti-aircraft gun	Ex-Wehrmacht, ex-Yugoslav People's Army.
Flak 38	(Nazi Germany) Germany	1940s	anti-aircraft gun	Ex-Wehrmacht, ex-Yugoslav People's Army.
Flak 88	(Nazi Germany) Germany	1940s	anti-aircraft gun	Ex-Wehrmacht, ex-Yugoslav People's Army.
Flakvierling 38	(Nazi Germany) Germany	1940s	anti-aircraft gun	Ex-Wehrmacht, ex-Yugoslav People's Army. Acquired 2022; gift of Northern Macedonia.
M1937 howitzer-gun	Soviet Union	late 1930s – early 1940s	howitzer-gun	Ex-Yugoslav People's Army.
M1942 divisional gun	Soviet Union	early 1940s	field gun	Ex-Yugoslav People's Army.
M1 Long Tom	United States	early 1940s	field gun	Ex-Yugoslav People's Army.
M7 Priest	United States	1940s	self-propelled artillery vehicle	Ex-Yugoslav People's Army.
M-48 B1	Yugoslavia / (Socialist Republic of Serbia) Serbia	1940s	mountain gun	Ex-Yugoslav People's Army.
ZSU-57	Soviet Union	late 1950s	self-propelled anti-aircraft gun	Ex-Yugoslav People's Army.
ZSU-57	Soviet Union	1963	self-propelled anti-aircraft gun	Ex-Yugoslav People's Army.
M53/59 Praga	Czechoslovak Socialist Republic	1960s	self-propelled anti-aircraft gun	Ex-Yugoslav People's Army.
M84	Yugoslavia / (Socialist Republic of Serbia) Serbia		gun-howitzer	Ex-Yugoslav People's Army.
M-63 Plamen	Yugoslavia / (Socialist Republic of Serbia) Serbia	1960s–70s	multiple rocket launcher	Ex-Yugoslav People's Army.
2S1 Gvozdika	Soviet Union	1970s–80s	self-propelled howitzer	Ex-Yugoslav People's Army.
Zastava M55	Yugoslavia / (Socialist Republic of Serbia) Serbia	1970s–80s	automatic anti-aircraft gun	Ex-Yugoslav People's Army.
Roland 2	Germany / France	1980s	surface-to-air missile system	Ex-Slovenian Army.
Auxiliary
M5 tractor	United States	1940s	artillery tractor	Ex-Yugoslav People's Army.
MT-LB	Soviet Union		auxiliary armored tracked vehicle	Ex-Yugoslav People's Army.
BTM-3	Soviet Union	1963	trench-digging vehicle	Ex-Yugoslav People's Army.
MT-55KS	Czechoslovak Socialist Republic	1970s–80s	bridge-laying vehicle	Ex-Yugoslav People's Army.
Transportation
Class 52 Military Locomotive	(Nazi Germany) Germany	early 1940s	Baureihe 52 4936 / JŽ 33-110 (Yugoslav designation)	Ex-Deutsche Reichsbahn, ex-Yugoslav Railways. Acquired 2016.
Harley-Davidson WLA	United States	1940s	motorcycle	Military version of civilian WL model.
Mercedes Benz 230-BINZ	Germany	1971	ambulance	In service during the Ten-Day War. Donated by Velenje Medical Center.
Yugo	Yugoslavia	1980s	four-door hatchback	Displayed being crushed by a tank in a diorama of the street barricades raised by civilians during the Ten-Day War.

== Gallery ==
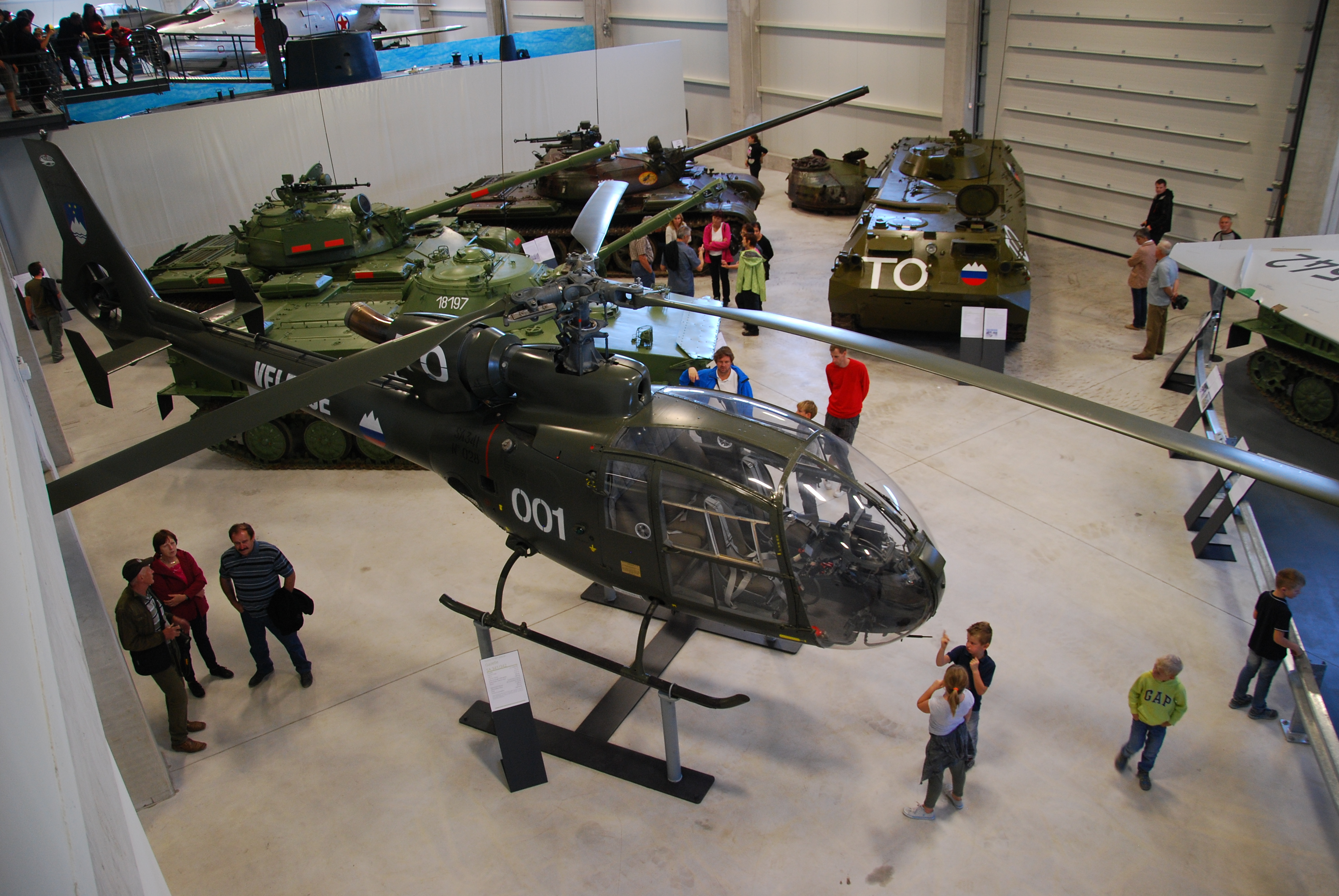
Aérospatiale/SOKO Gazelle

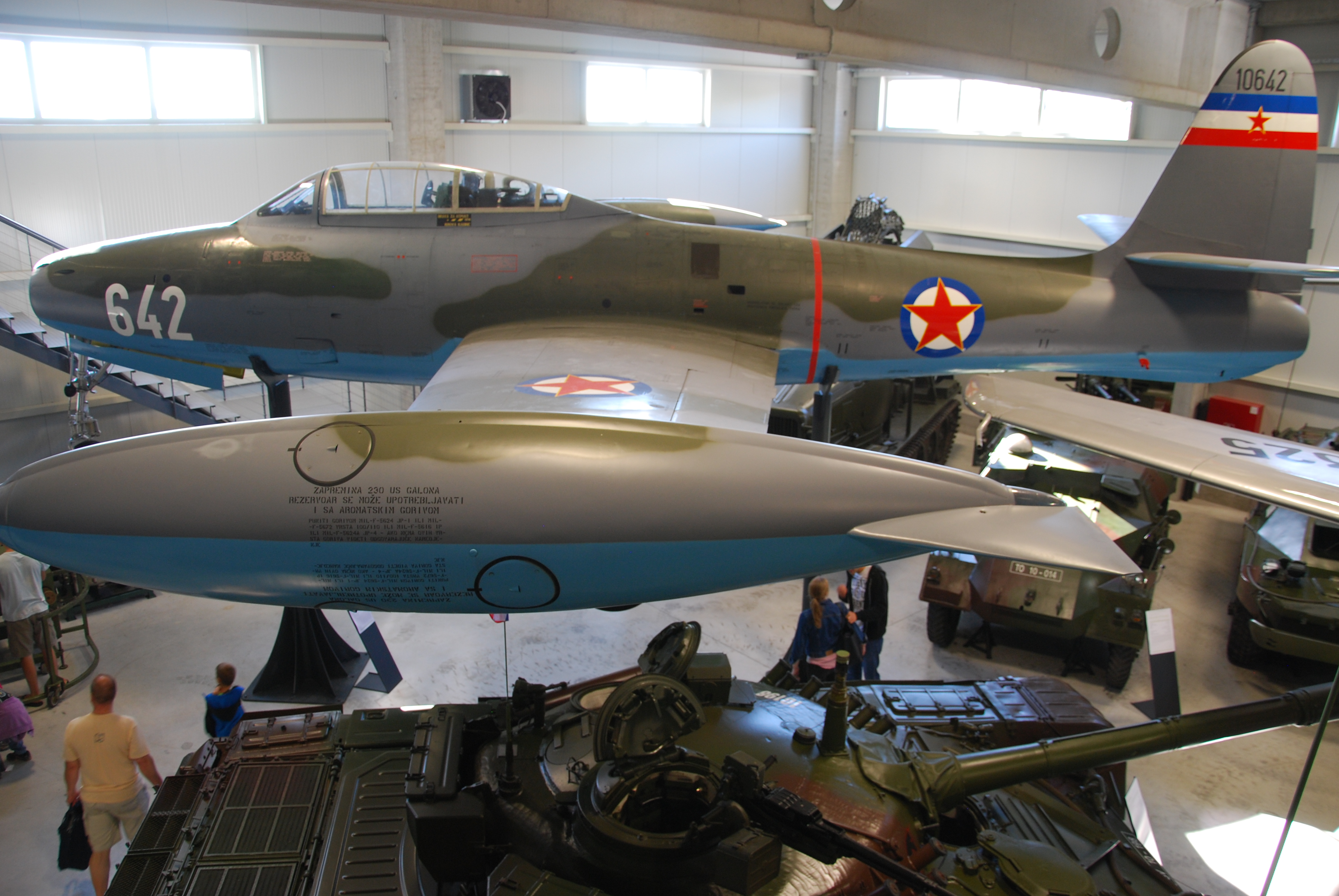
F-84G Thunderjet

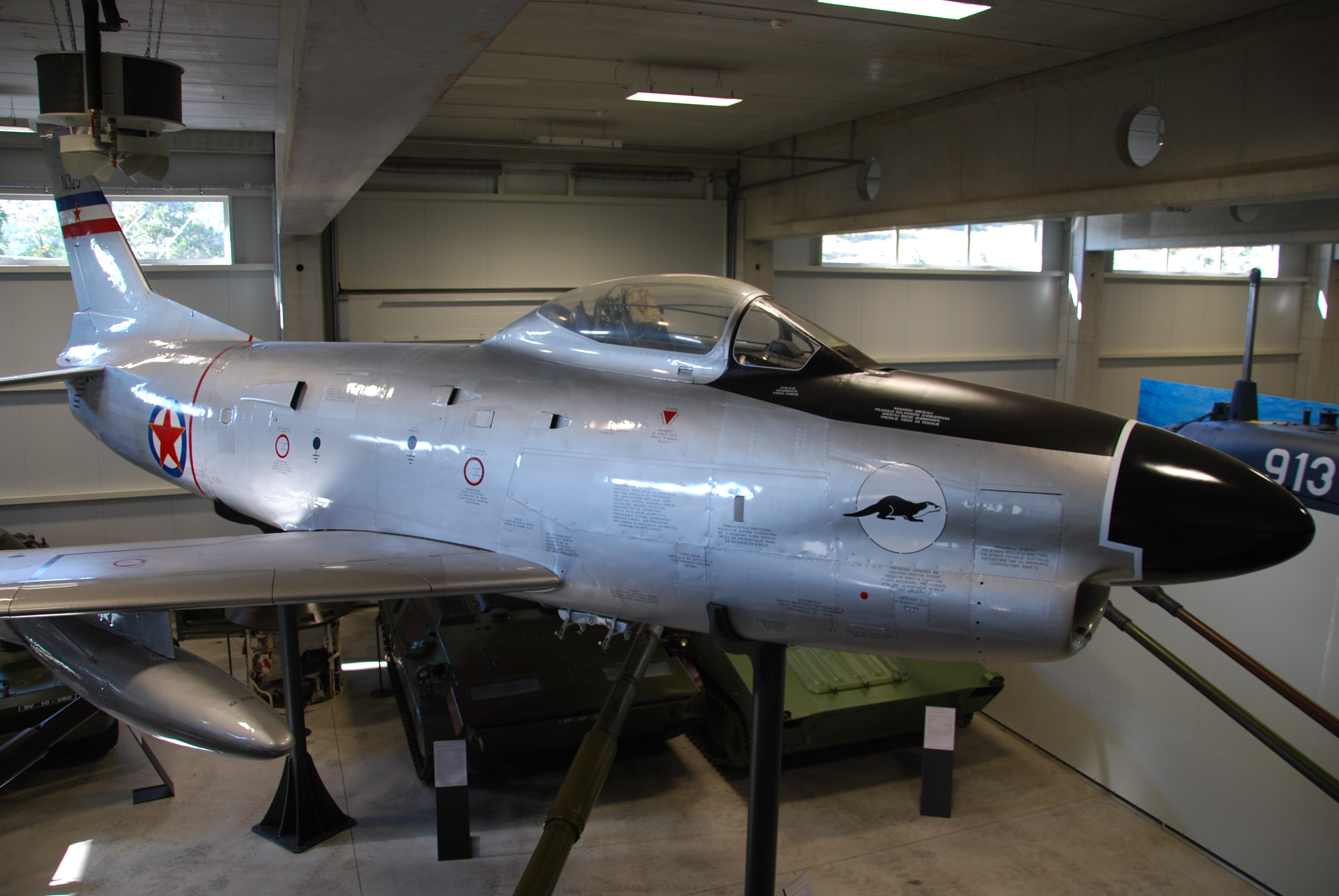
F-86D Sabre-Dog

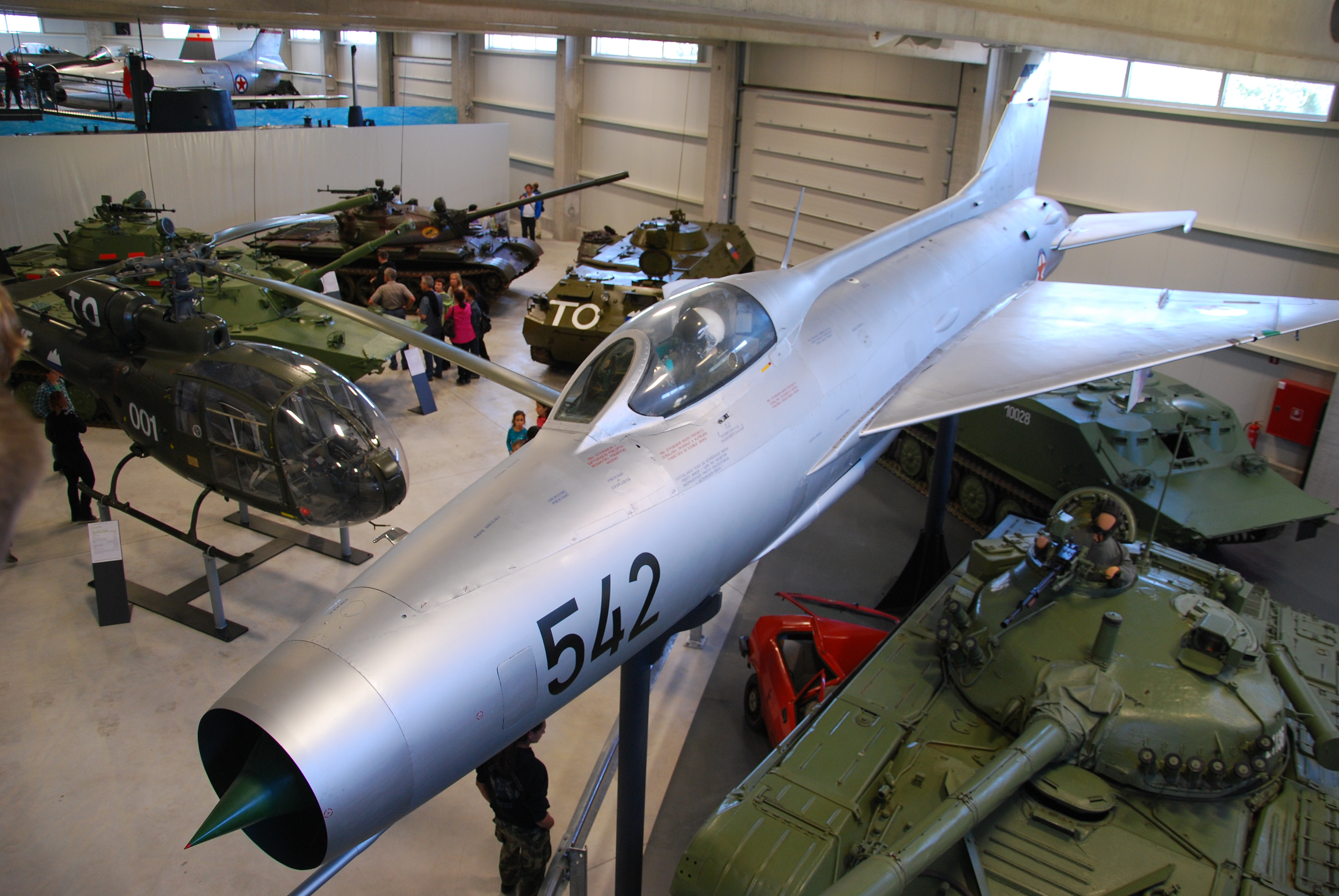
Mig-21 Fishbed

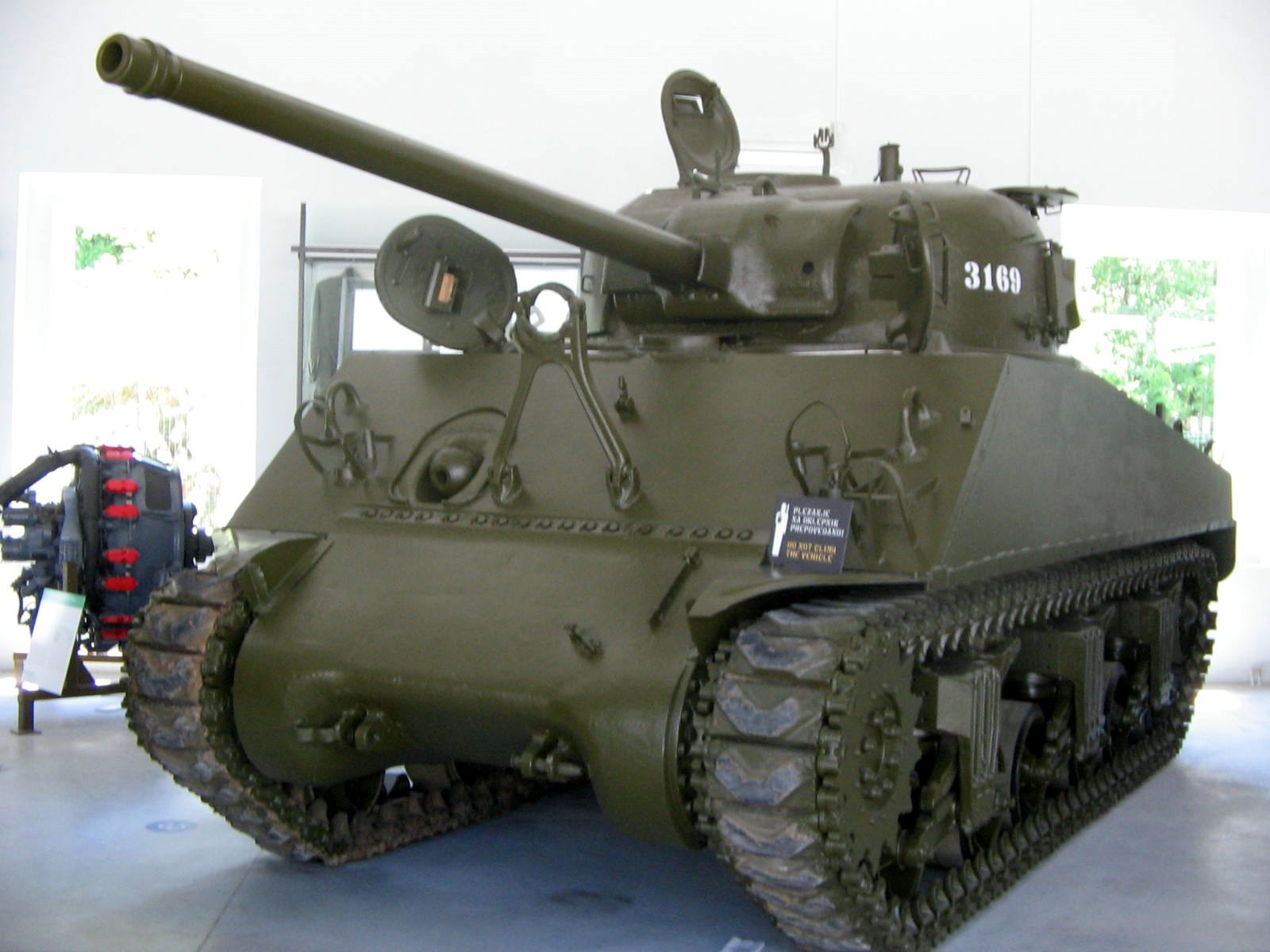
M4A3 Sherman

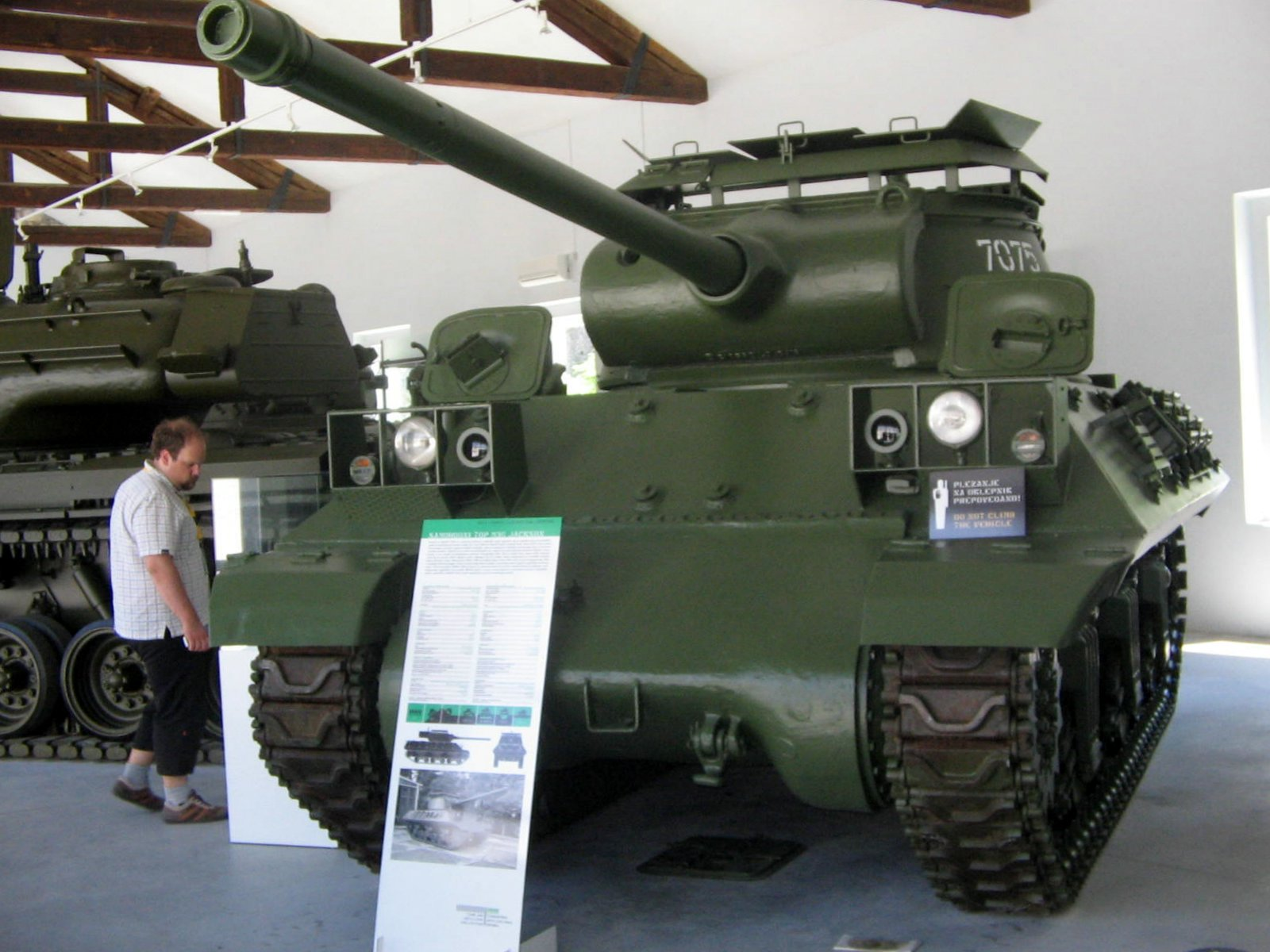
M36 Jackson

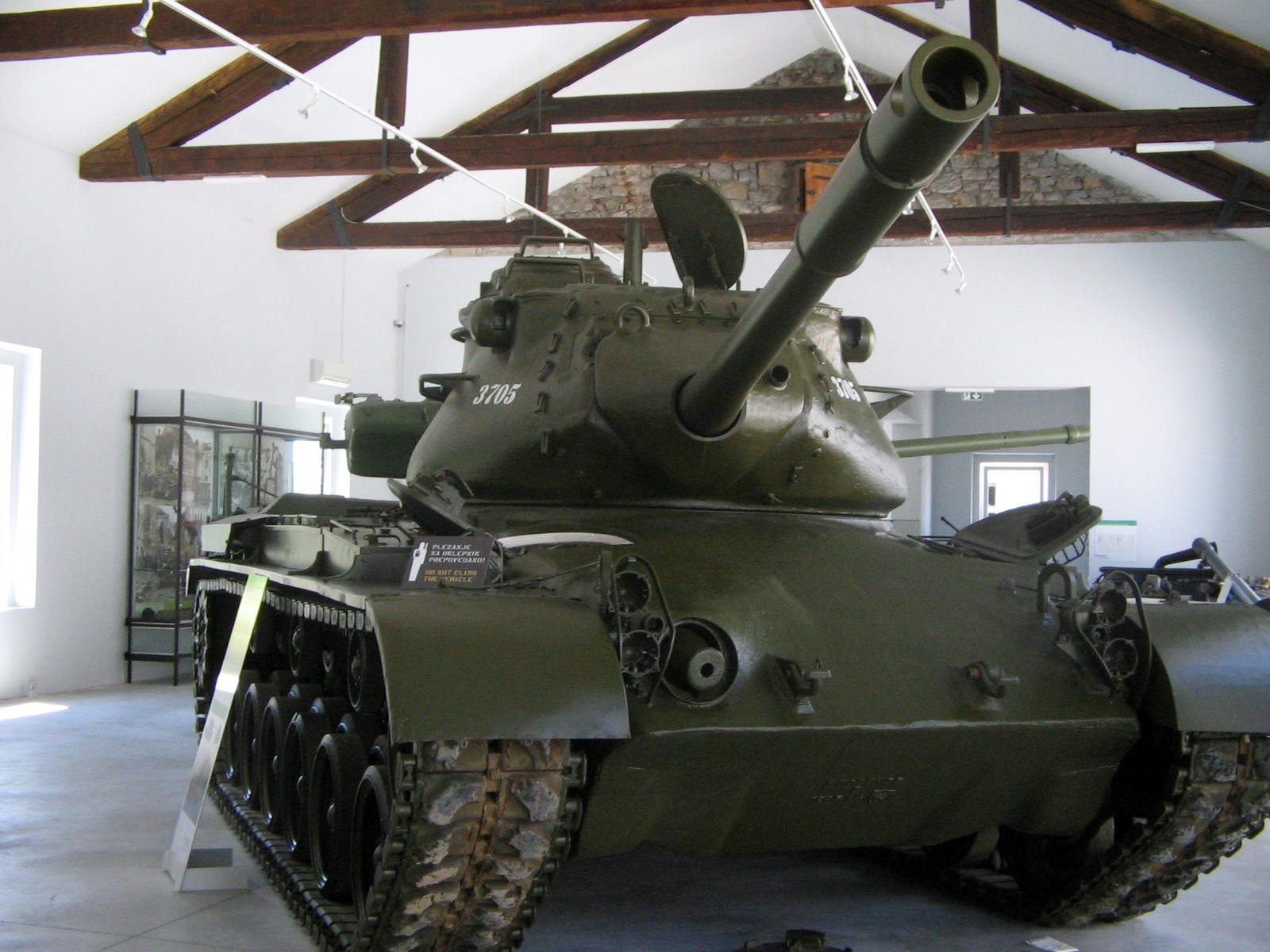
M47 Patton

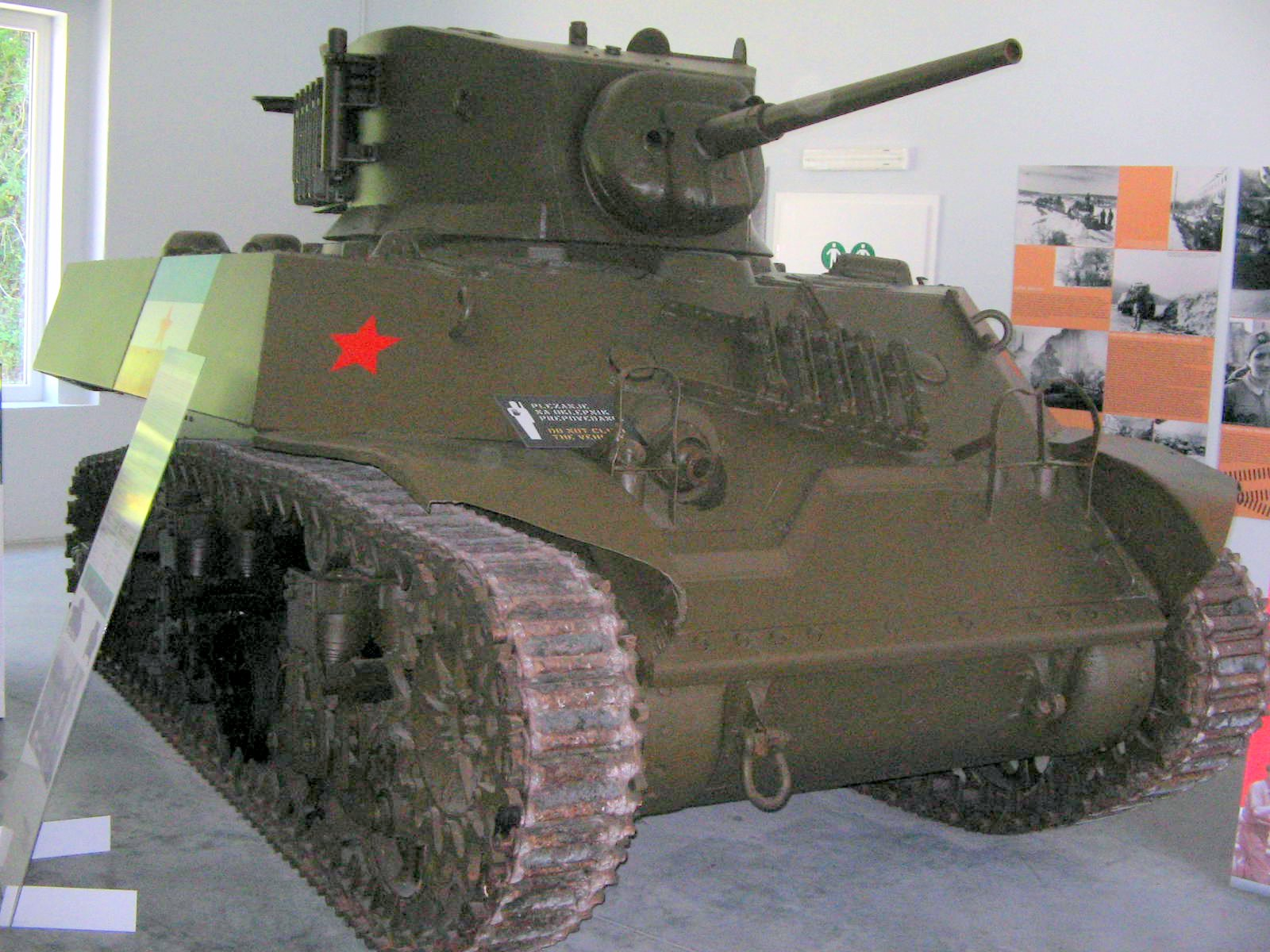
M3A3 Stuart

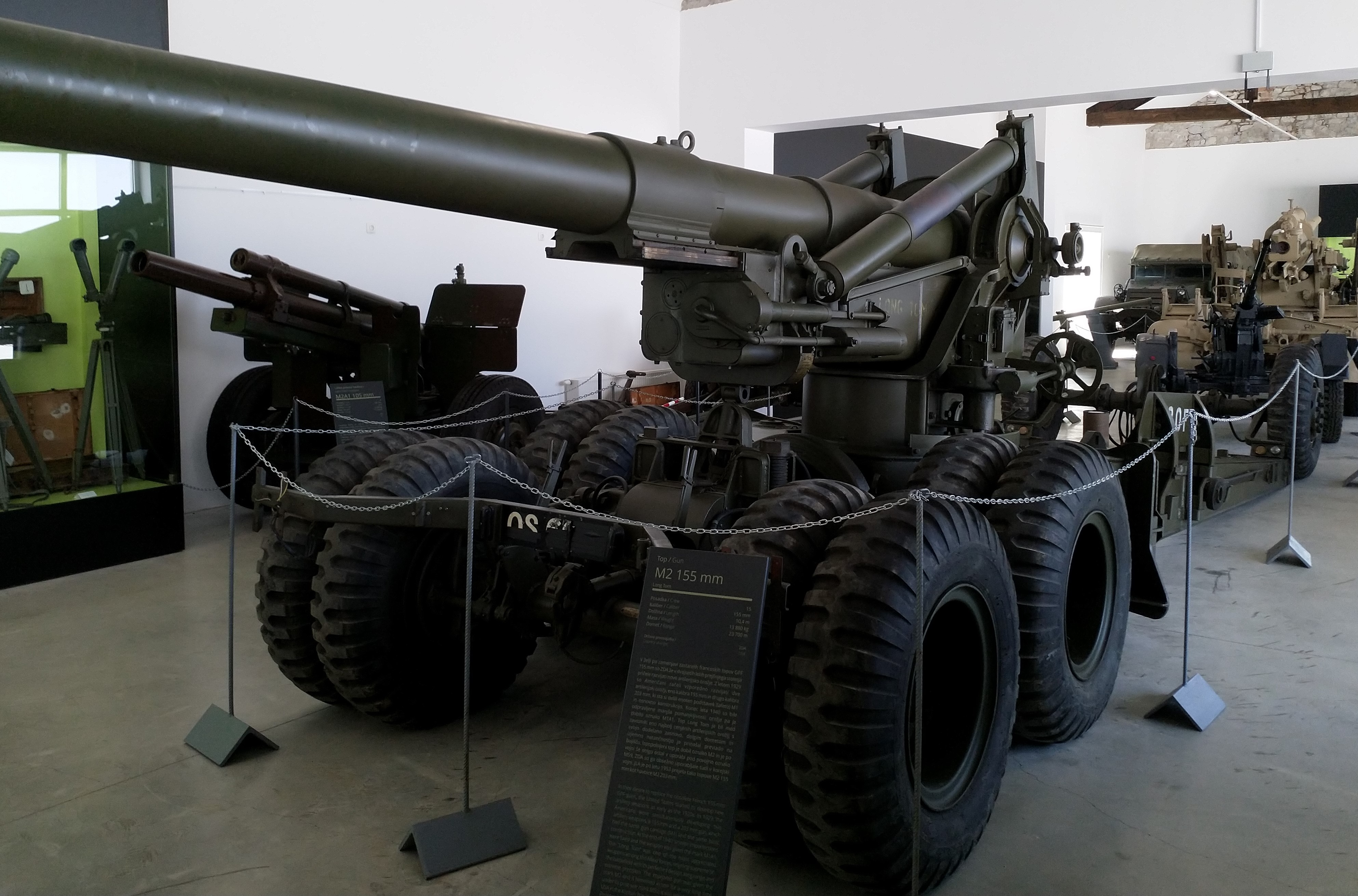
M2 155 mm Long Tom

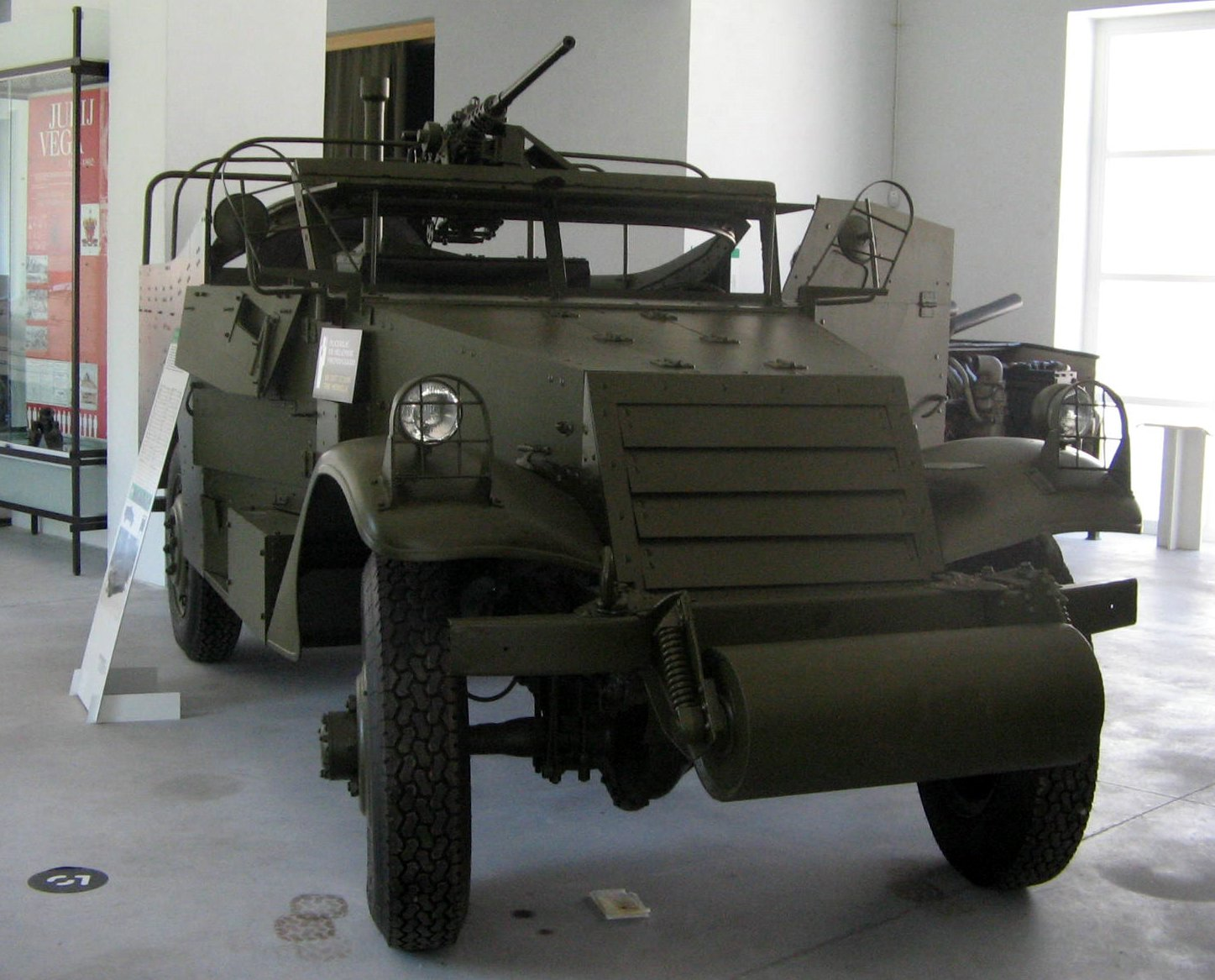
M3A1 Scout Car

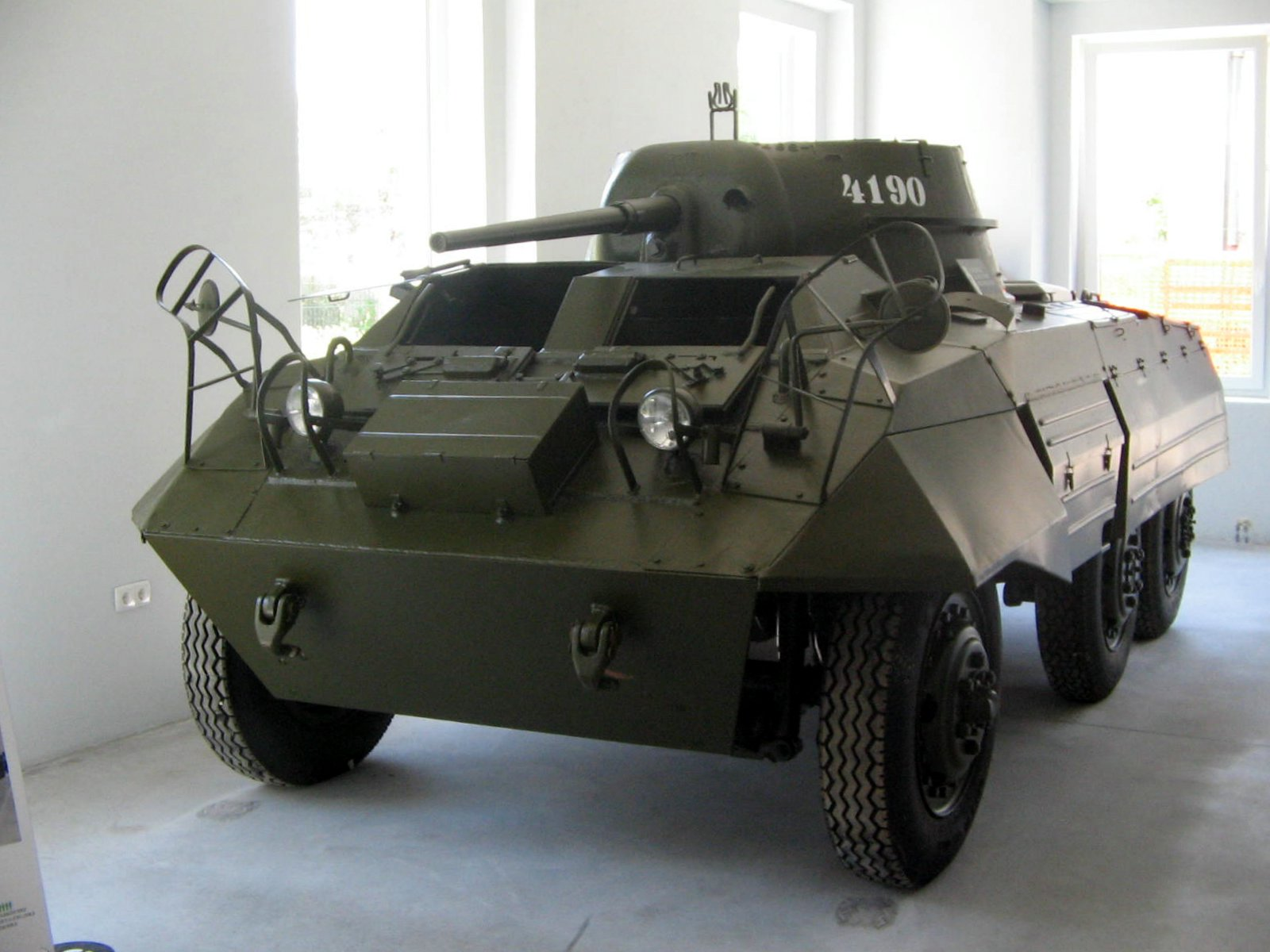
M8 Greyhound

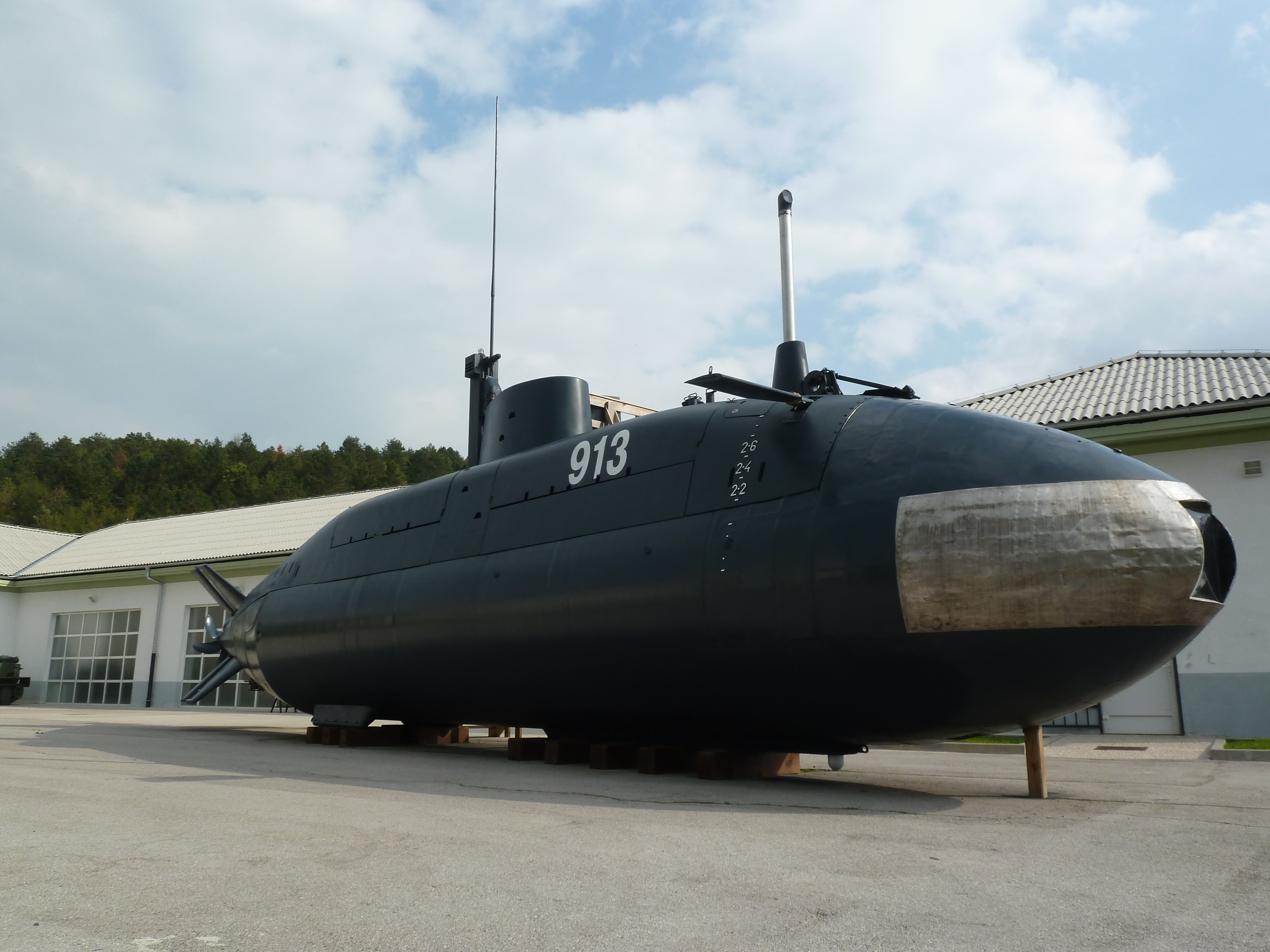
P-913 Commando Submarine

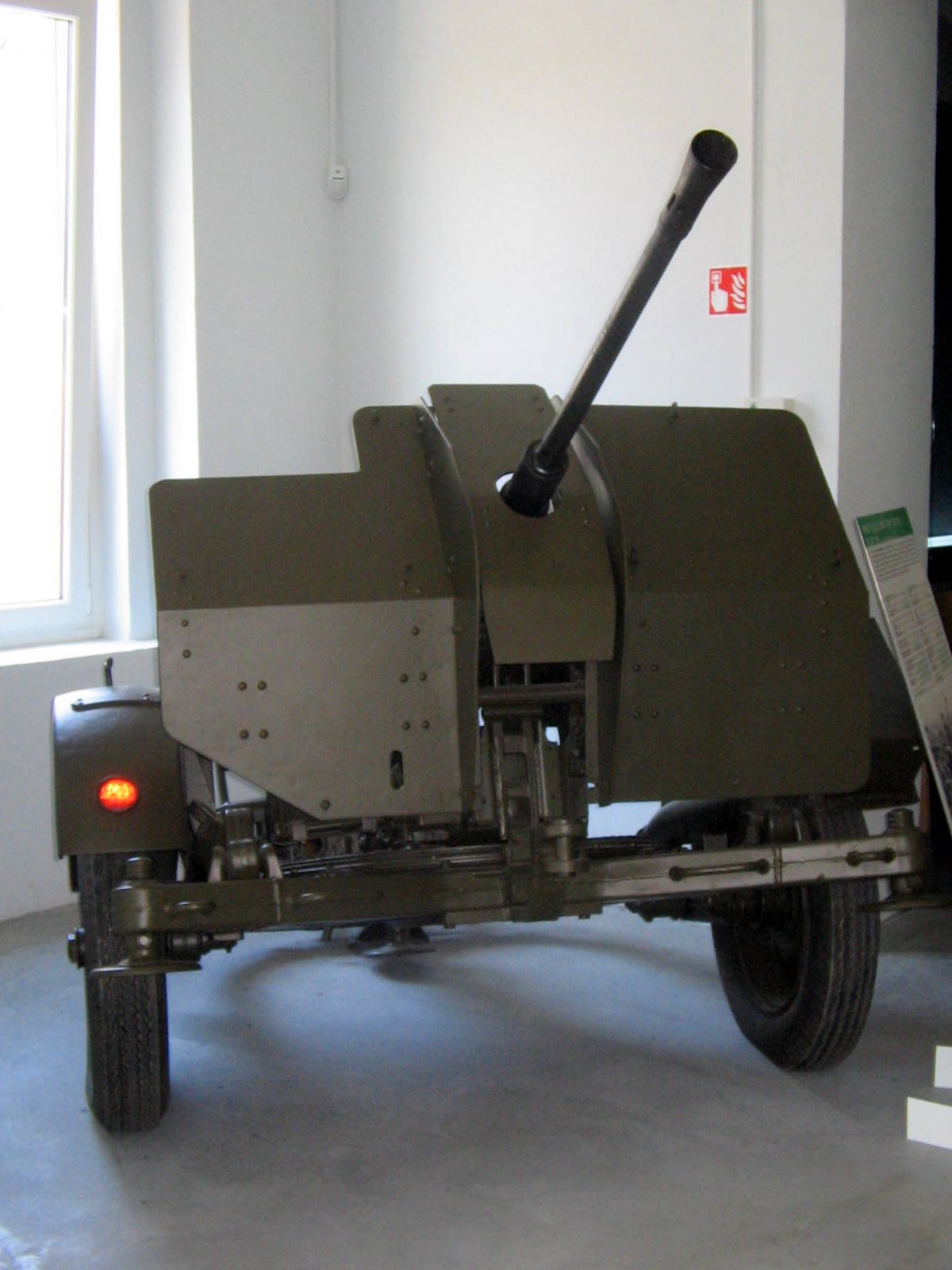
20mm Flak 38 anti-aircraft gun

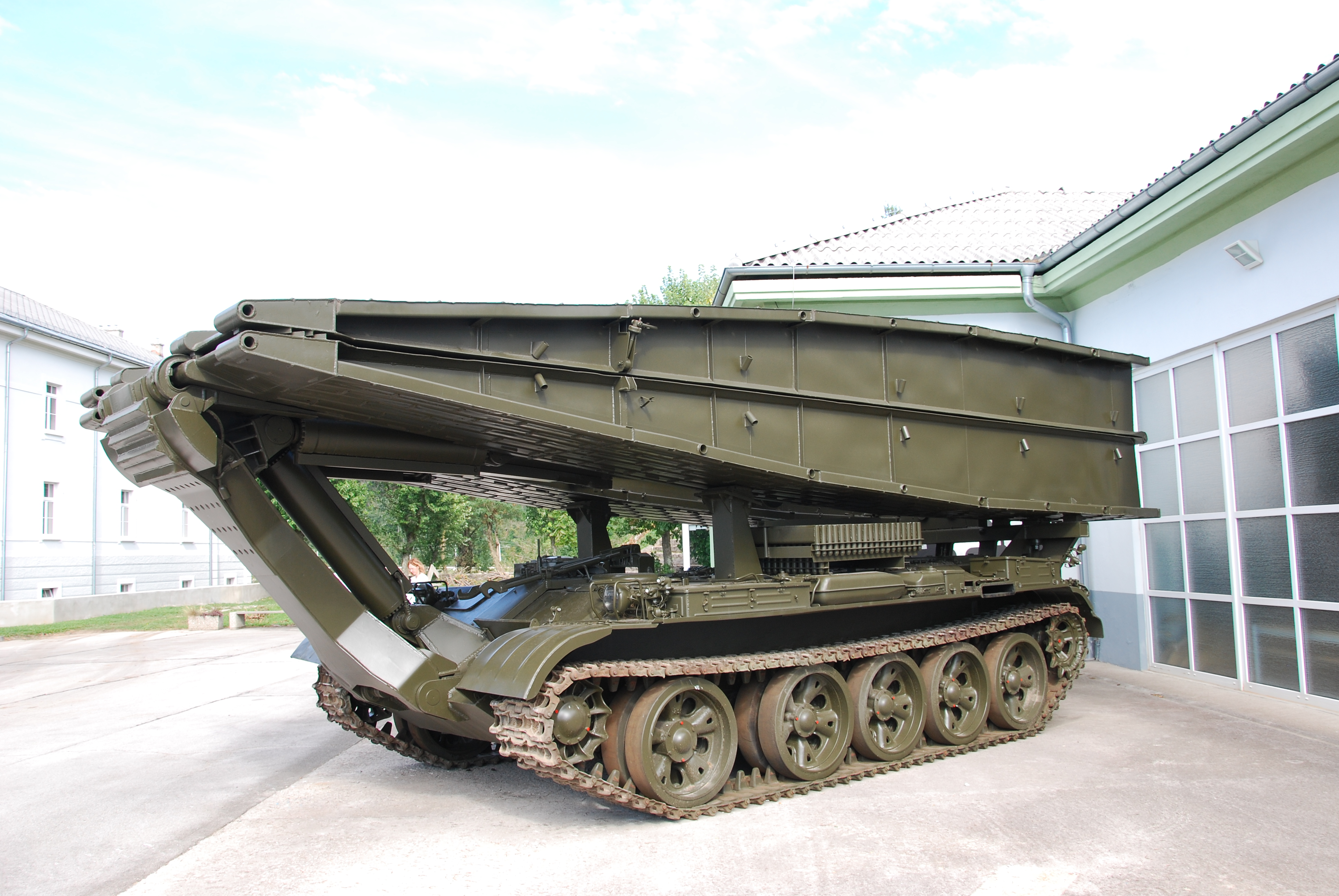
T-55 bridge layer

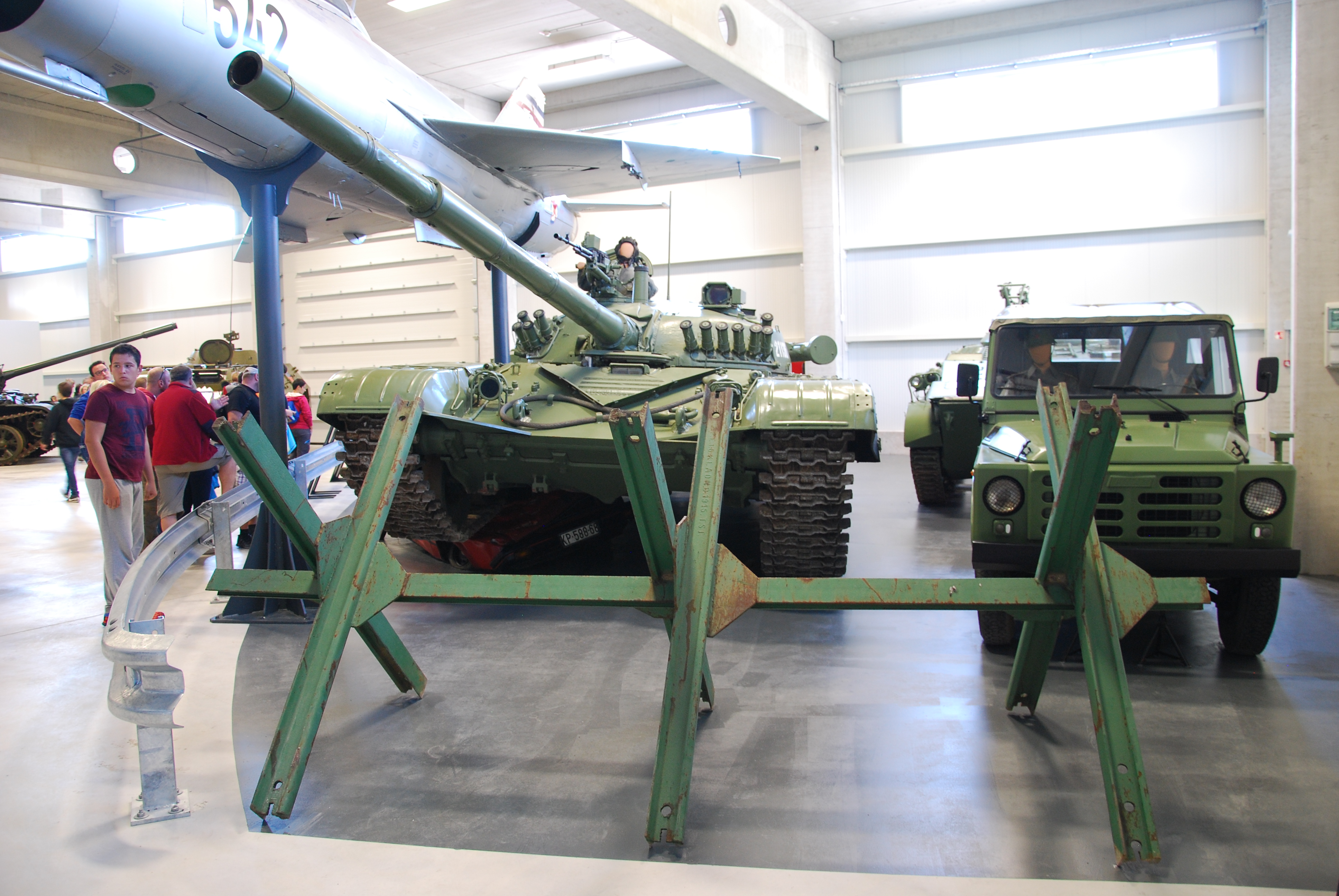
M-84

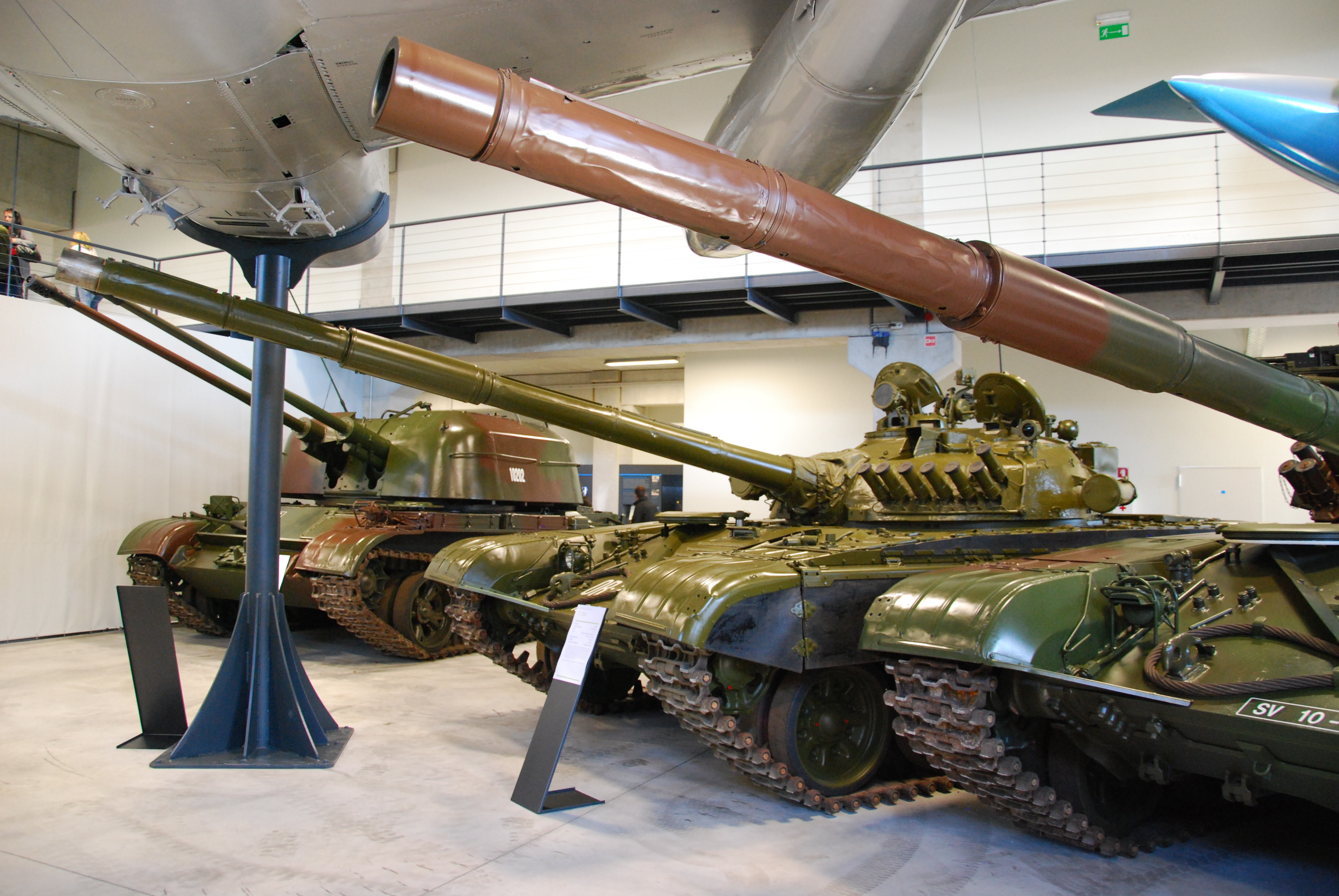
Armor collection

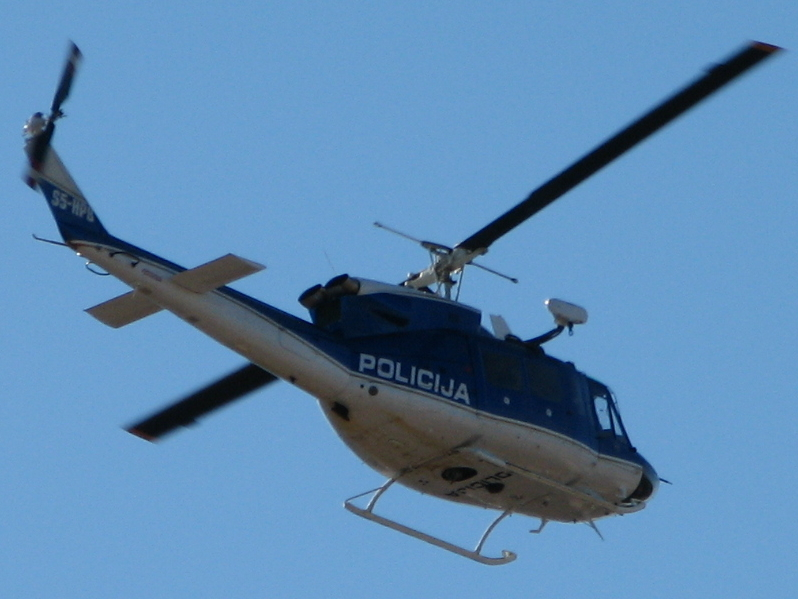
S5-HPB in operation - now retired, on display in museum

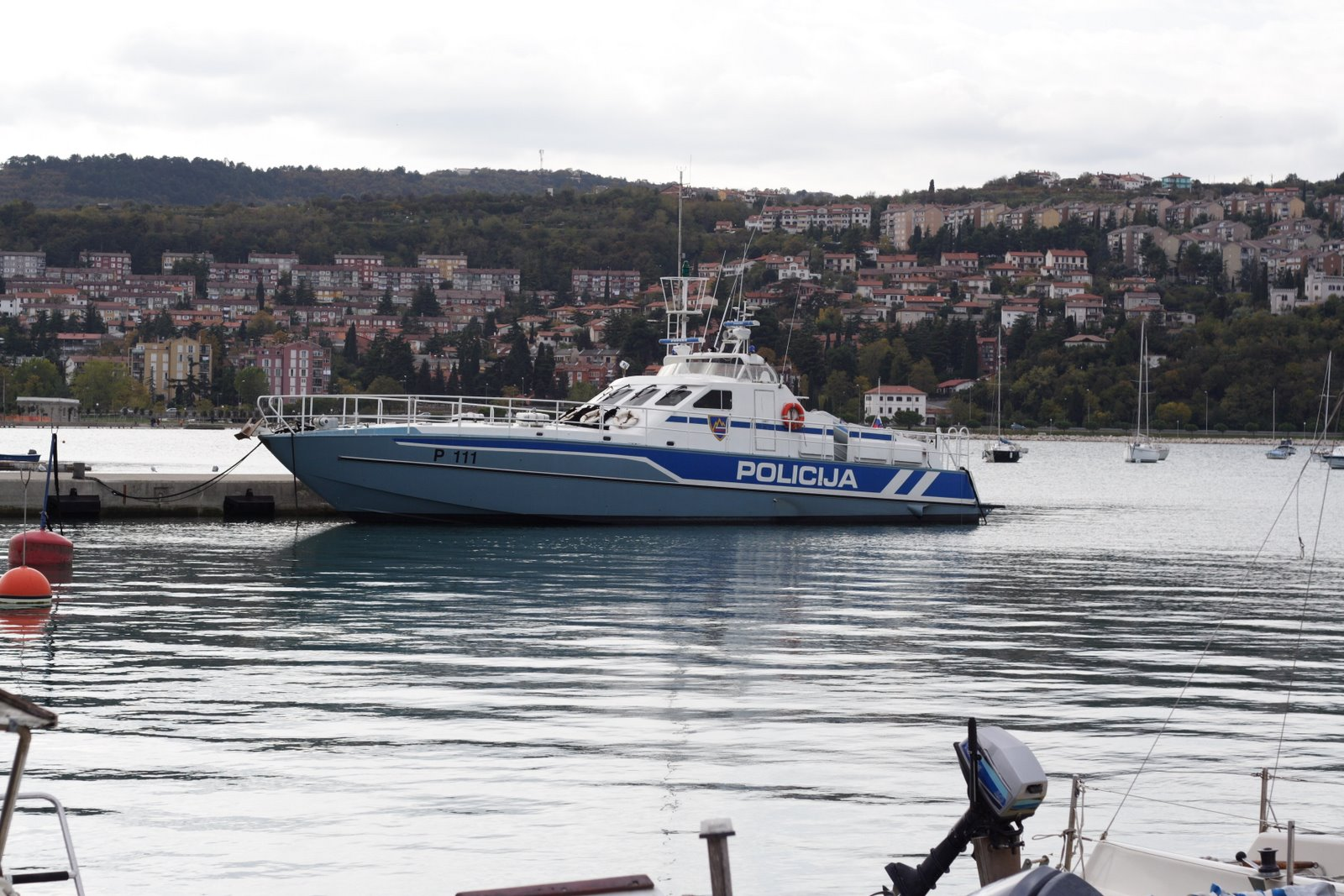
P-111 in Koper - now retired, on display in museum

== See also ==
- Military Museum, Belgrade
