= British S-class submarine =

British S-class submarine may refer to:

- British S-class submarine (1914), three submarines launched in 1914–1915 and transferred to the Italian Navy in 1915
- British S-class submarine (1931), sixty-two submarines launched in the 1930s and 1940s
