= Una-class submarine =

Yugoslav Navy's Una-class submarine

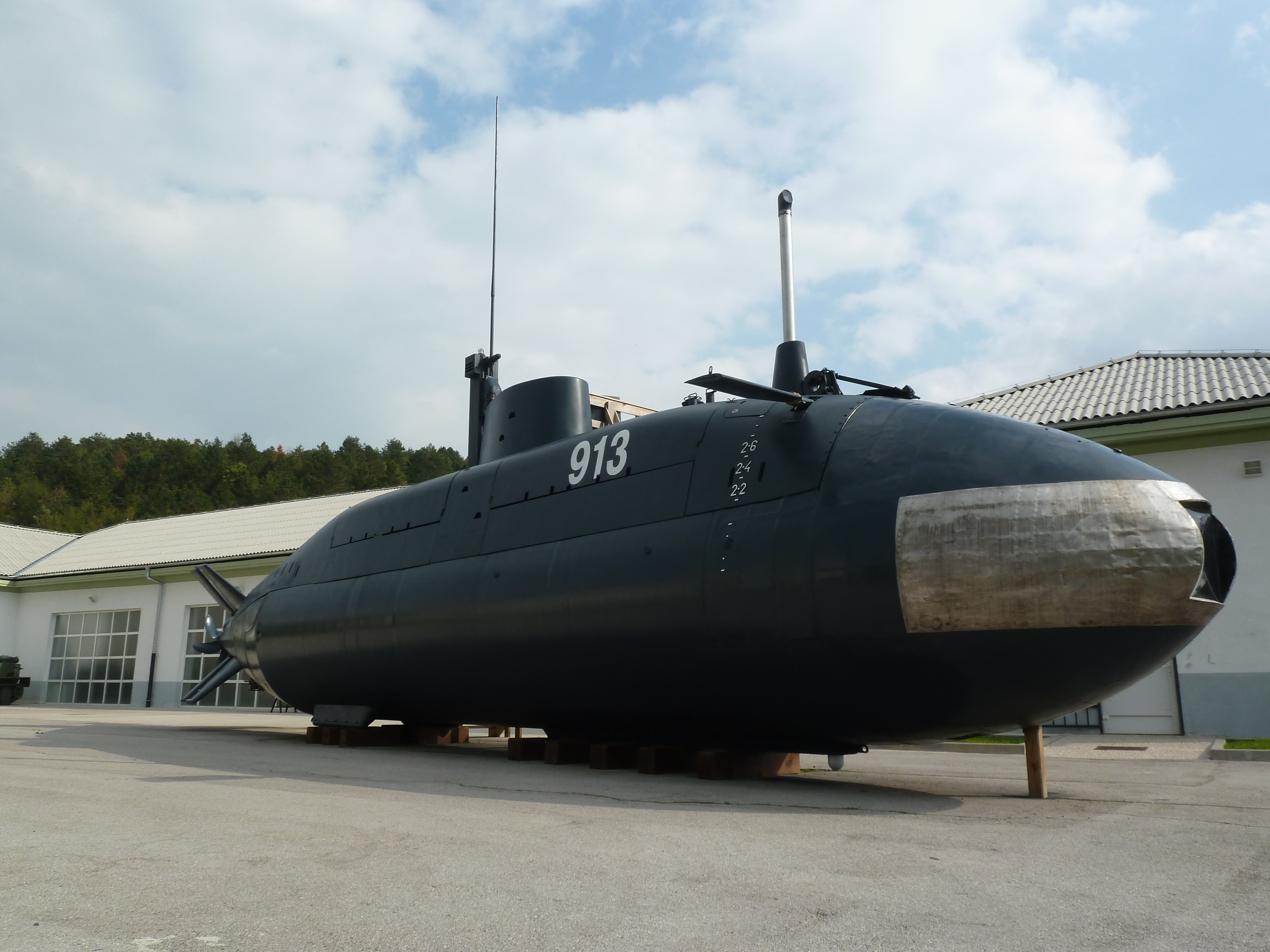
- Restored Zeta (P-913) exhibited at the Pivka Military History Park in Slovenia.

Class overview
- Builders: Brodogradilište specijalnih objekata (BSO), Split, SR Croatia, SFR Yugoslavia
- Built: 1985–1989
- Completed: 6

General characteristics
- Displacement: 76.1 tonnes (74.9 long tons) (surfaced); 87.6 tonnes (86.2 long tons) (submerged)
- Length: 18.82 m (61 ft 9 in)
- Beam: 2.7 m (8 ft 10 in)
- Draught: 2.4 m (7 ft 10 in)
- Depth: 120 m (390 ft)
- Propulsion: 2 × 18 kW (24 hp) electric motor
- Speed: 7 kn (13 km/h; 8 mph) (surfaced); 8 knots (15 km/h; 9 mph) (submerged)
- Range: 250–270 nmi (463–500 km; 288–311 mi) at 3 knots (6 km/h; 3 mph)
- Endurance: 96–160 hours (depending on number of personnel onboard)
- Complement: 4 + 6 naval commandos
- Armament: 4 × R-1 swimmer delivery vehicles; 4 × AIM-70 bottom mines

The Una-class submarine (also known as Type 911) was a class of six midget submarines built for the Yugoslav Navy at the Brodogradilište specijalnih objekata (English: Special objects shipyard) during the 1980s. They were designed with the purpose of laying small minefields and transporting naval special forces, with or without their submersibles, in shallow waters that were inaccessible for larger submarines. Due to their mission profile that called for a small design as well as the need to stay undetected, they lacked torpedo armament and a generator for battery recharging.

During the Croatian War of Independence and the dissolution of SFR Yugoslavia, five of the six boats were relocated to Boka Kotorska where they served with the rump Yugoslav Navy. One, Soča (P-914), was captured in drydock by Croatian forces. It was later modified and entered service with the Croatian Navy as Velebit (P-01). All of the boats have since been decommissioned.

== Development ==
During the 1970s the Brodarski Institute (BI) from Zagreb started working on a new class of submarines for the Yugoslav Navy (JRM). The project, designated B-91 and led by Lieutenant Colonel Davorin Kajić, was tasked with developing a class of midget submarines capable of operating in the shallow waters of the northern Adriatic. Using their small dimensions, the submarines were to be able to maneuver in depths as shallow as 10 metres (33 ft); such abilities were needed to conduct offensive minelaying near the enemy coastline, reconnaissance, and transporting naval special forces in hostile waters.

All six boats were completed from 1985 to 1989 at the Brodogradilište Specijalnih Objekata (BSO) in Split, SR Croatia and named after rivers in SFR Yugoslavia: Tisa (P-911), Una (P-912), Zeta (P-913), Soča (P-914), Kupa (P-915) and Vardar (P-916). Further planned improvements included the addition of a Stirling engine, either by refitting the existing boats or building a new, seventh one, but the imminent breakup of Yugoslavia happened before anything was realized.

== Description ==
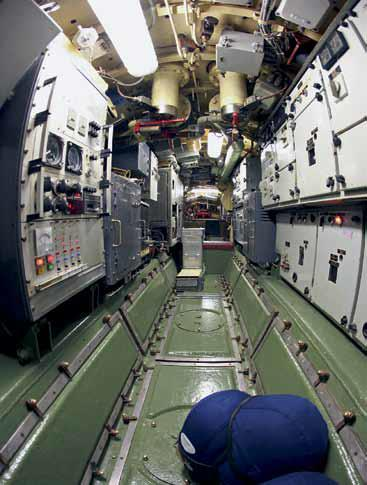
Interior of Zeta (P-913) after renovation

The Una class featured a single-hulled design, measuring 18.82 m (61 ft 9 in) in length with an average draught of 2.4 m (7.9 ft). The boats displaced 76.1 tonnes (74.9 long tons) when surfaced and 87.6 tonnes (86.2 long tons) when submerged. Because deploying naval commandos was one of their main tasks, they were equipped with an underwater exit/re-entry chamber.

Propulsion consisted of two 18-kilowatt (24 hp) electric motors, mounted on a single shaft and powered by two battery groups with 128 cells each. The class lacked the ability to recharge during surface drive making them dependent on external power sources such as harbours and depot ships. Maximum achievable speed was 8 knots (15 km/h; 9 mph) underwater and 7 knots (13 km/h; 8 mph) surfaced. Traveling at a speed of 3 knots (6 km/h; 3 mph) they had a range of 250–270 nautical miles (460–500 km; 290–310 mi). Maximum diving depth was 120 m (390 ft). The sensor suite included an active/passive Krupp Atlas sonar.

In accordance with their expected mission, the boats could transport up to six naval commandos armed with 6–12 M-66 or M-71 limpet mines. Also at their disposal were four large AIM-70/71 bottom mines mounted on the outside of the submarines. Four R-1 swimmer delivery vehicles could be carried in place of the AIM-70/71 mines. With a full crew of six members the boats had an underwater endurance of 160 hours which was reduced to 96 hours if the complement numbered ten personnel (four crew members and six naval commandos).

== Boats ==
Name	Pennant number	Namesake	Builder	Completed	Decommissioned	Fate
Tisa	P-911	Tisa	Brodogradilište specijalnih objekata, Split, SR Croatia, SFR Yugoslavia	1985	1997/2001	extant; to be donated to the Museum of Science and Technology in Belgrade, Serbia. The submarine was delivered to Belgrade in June 2018.
Una	P-912	Una	Brodogradilište specijalnih objekata, Split, SR Croatia, SFR Yugoslavia	1986	1997/2001	extant; Porto Montenegro Museum, Montenegro.
Zeta	P-913	Zeta	Brodogradilište specijalnih objekata, Split, SR Croatia, SFR Yugoslavia	1987	2005	extant; Pivka Park of Military History, Slovenia.
Soča	P-914	Soča	Brodogradilište specijalnih objekata, Split, SR Croatia, SFR Yugoslavia	1987	2001/2005	extant; to be donated to a museum
Kupa	P-915	Kupa	Brodogradilište specijalnih objekata, Split, SR Croatia, SFR Yugoslavia	1989	2003	scrapped in 2008
Vardar	P-916	Vardar	Brodogradilište specijalnih objekata, Split, SR Croatia, SFR Yugoslavia	1989	2005	fate unknown

== History ==
=== Service and decommissioning ===
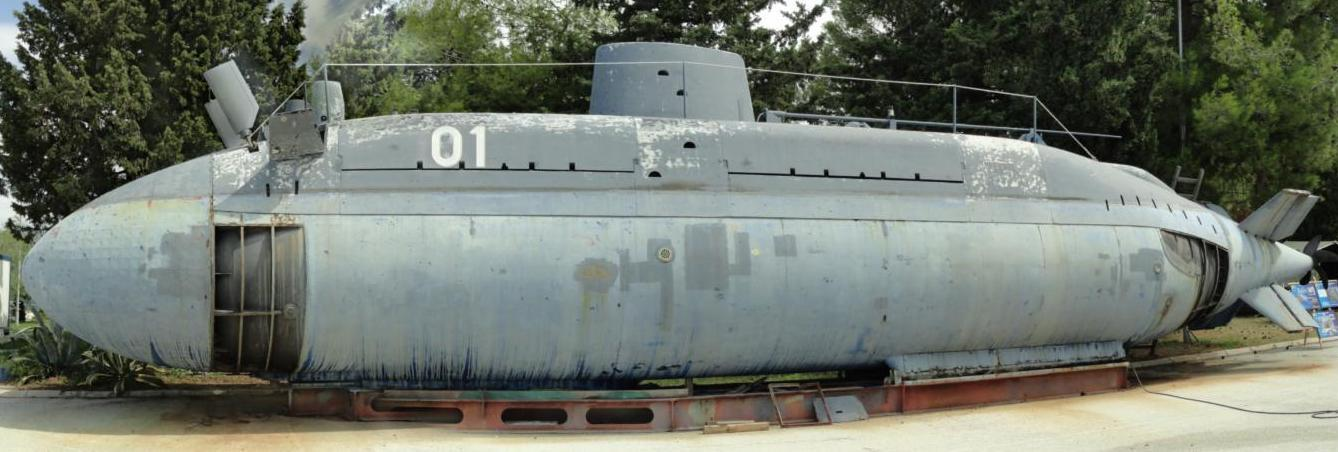
Velebit (ex Soča) photographed in the Lora Naval Base in August 2011. Due to modifications carried out by the Croatians after the war, Velebit is longer than other Una-class boats

All six boats were in service with the 88th submarine flotilla of the JRM with Lora Naval Base being their homeport. At the start of the Croatian War of Independence all boats except Soča were relocated to Montenegro without participating in combat operations. Croatian forces captured Soča in drydock at the BSO where it was undergoing an overhaul. Soča underwent a modification program that improved its autonomy by installing a diesel generator. It was recommissioned, now with the Croatian Navy, in 1996 as Velebit (P-01) and remained in service until the early 2000s when it was declared redundant. The remaining boats entered service with the new SR Yugoslav Navy. The first ones to be decommissioned sometime between 1997 and 2001 were Tisa and Una. In 2003 a decision was made that the ongoing major overhaul of Kupa would stop; the boat was decommissioned and broken up in 2008. It appears that the last Una-class boats in service with the SR Yugoslav Navy were Zeta and Vardar, both of them being decommissioned in 2005.

=== Aftermath ===
Ownership of the decommissioned boats passed on to Montenegro after the country declared independence in 2006, ending the state of Serbia and Montenegro and its joint armed forces. In 2009 the Ministry of Defence announced that it is willing to donate three Una-class submarines to former SFR Yugoslav republics of Slovenia, Croatia and Serbia. Although the "Submariner" society from Pula was interested in accepting the donation and exhibiting it in a museum, the Croatian MoD responded with a statement that accepting the donation is against national interests; since most of the fleet of the former Yugoslav Navy was relocated to Montenegro at the beginning of the Croatian War of Independence, Croatia claims the military equipment of the former joint armed forces was stolen, and should be a subject of succession. The MoD further explains that the state interest is in compensation for that equipment, not returning "obsolete, damaged and corroded equipment which nowadays Serbia and Montenegro are unsuccessfully trying to sell".

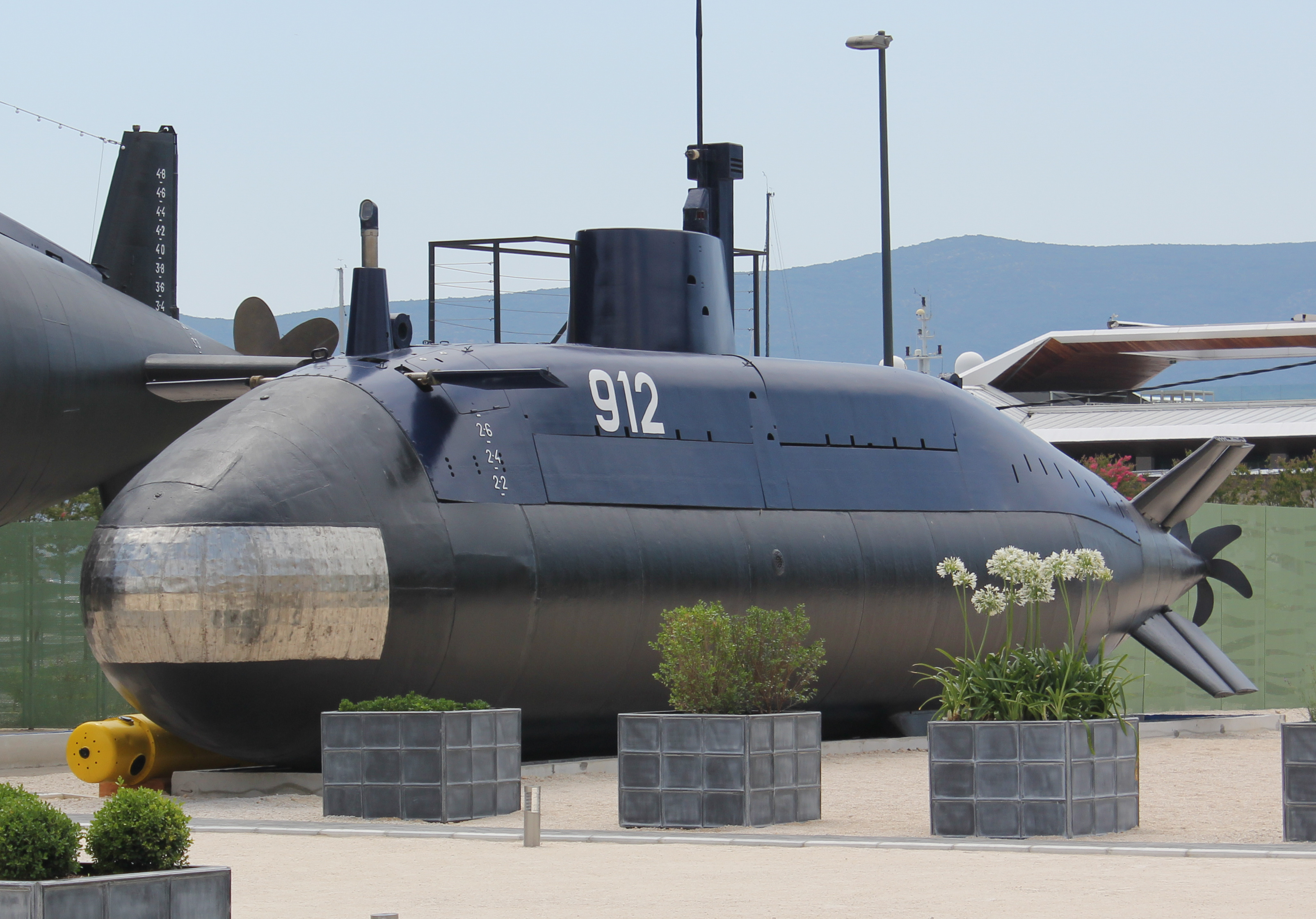
Una (P-912)

Slovenia on the other hand reacted positively to the offer; in 2011 Zeta was loaded on a truck and transported to Bar, then across Adriatic to Bari, Italy and along Italian coast to Slovenia. Although longer and thus more expensive, sea routes and roads that included crossing the Croatian border were avoided in fear of Croatian authorities confiscating the submarine. P-913 was restored with the help of the "Slovenian Submariners Society" and the Slovenian Army, being officially placed on display at the Pivka Park of Military History on 17 September 2011.

In 2013, Una and a Heroj-class attack submarine, Heroj (P-821), were restored and opened to the public in the museum section of the Porto Montenegro marina. The project was initiated by the "Submariner" Society from Tivat and was, after approval by the Montenegro MoD, financed by Porto Montenegro. The donation of one of the submarines to Serbia was initiated by the "Submariner" society from Belgrade in 2009. However it wasn't until five years later in June 2014 that the Government of Montenegro officially accepted the proposal and agreed to cede Tisa (P-911) to Serbia. The submarine will be exhibited at the Museum of Science and Technology in Belgrade.
