= SM UA =

Submarine used by Imperial Germany during World War I

Coordinates: 51°03.29′0″N 01°15.63′0″E

History

German Empire
- Name: UA
- Ordered: 25 September 1912
- Builder: Germaniawerft, Kiel
- Cost: 1,729,000 Goldmark
- Yard number: 202
- Laid down: 4 April 1913
- Launched: 9 May 1914
- Commissioned: 14 August 1914
- Fate: Surrendered 24 November 1918; foundered in tow April 1919

General characteristics
- Class & type: Norwegian A-class submarine
- Displacement: 270 t (270 long tons) surfaced; 342 t (337 long tons) submerged
- Length: 46.70 m (153 ft 3 in) (OA)
- Beam: 4.78 m (15 ft 8 in)
- Draught: 2.80 m (9 ft 2 in)
- Propulsion: 2 shafts; Germania 6-cylinder four stroke Diesel engine with 700 ihp (520 kW); 2 × SSW modyn by with 380 ihp (280 kW); 450 rpm surfaced; 350 rpm submerged
- Speed: 14.2 knots (26.3 km/h; 16.3 mph) surfaced; 7.3 knots (13.5 km/h; 8.4 mph) submerged
- Range: 900 nautical miles (1,700 km; 1,000 mi) at 10 knots (19 km/h; 12 mph)
- Test depth: 50 m (160 ft)
- Complement: 3 officers, 18 men
- Sensors & processing systems: 2 × periscopes
- Armament: 3 × 45 cm (17.7 in) torpedo tube with 5 torpedoes; 1 8.8 cm (3.5 in) SK L/30 deck gun; 1 machine gun

Service record
- Part of: Baltic Flotilla; Unknown start - 21 May 1916; Training Flotilla; 21 May 1916 - 11 November 1918
- Operations: None
- Victories: None

SM UA (Note: "SM" stands for "Seiner Majestät" (English: His Majesty's) and combined with the U for Unterseeboot would be translated as His Majesty's Submarine.) was a U-boat of the Imperial German Navy during World War I. Built as the fifth submarine of the Norwegian A class the boat was launched 9 May 1914 and confiscated by the German government after the outbreak of World War I on 5 August 1914. Commissioned as SM U 0 on 14 August 1914 the boat was renamed UA two weeks later and assigned to coastal protection. In 1916 UA was transferred to the Uschule (Submarine School).

UA was surrendered to the Allies at Harwich on 24 November 1918 in accordance with the requirements of the Armistice with Germany. She was lost on tow off Folkestone in April 1919 while being transferred from Harwich to a French port. The wreck was identified by archaeologist Innes McCartney in 2013.
