= Hajen-class submarine =

The Swedish Navy has operated three Hajen-class submarines, sometimes disambiguated by roman numerals:

- HSwMS Hajen (1904), Sweden's first submarine, operated between 1904 and 1922
- Hajen II-class submarine, operated between 1917 and 1943
- Hajen III-class submarine, operated between 1957 and 1980
