= HNoMS Kobben (1909) =

Class overview
- Name: Kobben (A-1)
- Builders: Krupp Germania shipyard at Kiel, Germany
- Operators: Royal Norwegian Navy
- Succeeded by: A class
- In service: 1909–1926
- Completed: 1

General characteristics
- Displacement: 206 t (203 long tons) ↑; 259 t (255 long tons) ↓
- Length: 39.3 m (128 ft 11 in)
- Beam: 3.7 m (12 ft 2 in)
- Draught: 3.0 m (9 ft 10 in)
- Propulsion: 2 × 225 bhp (168 kW) kerosine engines; 2 × 150 shp (110 kW) electric engines
- Speed: 11.9 kn (22.0 km/h; 13.7 mph) ↑; 8.9 knots (16.5 km/h; 10.2 mph) ↓
- Range: 1,450 nmi (2,690 km; 1,670 mi) at 9 knots (17 km/h; 10 mph) ↑; 45 nmi (83 km; 52 mi) at 6.5 knots (12.0 km/h; 7.5 mph) ↓
- Test depth: 50 m (164 ft)
- Complement: 14
- Armament: 3 × 18 in (46 cm) torpedo tubes

Kobben (renamed to A-1 in 1913) was the first submarine of the Royal Norwegian Navy. It was delivered on 28 November 1909. The boat was stricken in 1926 and scrapped in 1933. It was succeeded by the A class.
