= Norwegian A-class submarine =

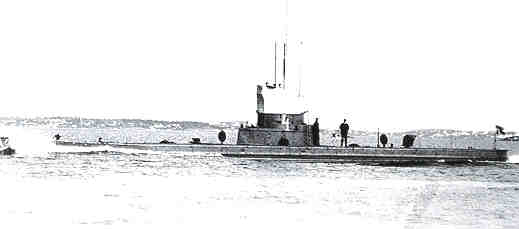
- HNoMS A-4

Class overview
- Builders: Krupp Germania Kiel, Germany
- Operators: Royal Norwegian Navy
- Preceded by: HNoMS Kobben (1909)
- Succeeded by: B class
- In service: – 16 April 1940
- In commission: 2 March 1914
- Planned: 4
- Building: 4
- Completed: 4
- Lost: 3

General characteristics
- Type: Submarine
- Displacement: 270 t (270 long tons) ↑; 342 t (337 long tons) ↓
- Length: 46.7 m (153 ft 3 in)
- Beam: 4.78 m (15 ft 8 in)
- Draught: 2.8 m (9 ft 2 in)
- Propulsion: 2 × vertical 700 shp (520 kW) diesel engines; 2 × 380 shp (280 kW) electric motors
- Speed: 14.2 kn (26.3 km/h; 16.3 mph) ↑; 9 knots (17 km/h; 10 mph) ↓
- Range: 1,600 nmi (3,000 km; 1,800 mi) at 9 knots (17 km/h; 10 mph) ↑; 100 nmi (190 km; 120 mi) at 3 knots (5.6 km/h; 3.5 mph) ↓
- Test depth: 50 m (164 ft)
- Boats & landing craft carried: 1 dingi
- Complement: 16 (? officers and ? ratings)
- Armament: 3 × 45 cm (18 in) torpedo tubes; 1 × 76 mm gun

The A-class submarines were a class of three vessels of German design built by the Krupp Germania naval shipyard in Kiel, Germany from 1913 to 1914 and deployed by the Royal Norwegian Navy.

The Norwegian government purchased four submarines that were almost completed in 1913 and received three of these before World War I. The fourth, A-5, was seized by German authorities at the outbreak of war and commissioned as SM UA. It was used for coastal protection and from 1916 as a training vessel in the Baltic Sea.

== Fates ==
All three A-class submarines were lost in the first week following the German invasion of Norway, one in combat and the other two through scuttling.

- A-2 (2 March 1914 – 9 April 1940) attacked and severely damaged by the two German R boat minesweepers R-22 and R-23 off the Vallø peninsula near Tønsberg in the Oslofjord on 9 April 1940. Her crew was captured and she drifted ashore at Vallø, a total wreck.
- A-3 (1914 – 16 April 1940) scuttled by own crew in Verkbukta at Tønsberg on 16 April 1940
- A-4 (1914 – 16 April 1940) scuttled by own crew in Verkbukta at Tønsberg on 16 April 1940

== Literature ==
- Abelsen, Frank (1986). Norwegian naval ships 1939–1945 (in Norwegian and English). Oslo: Sem & Stenersen AS. ISBN 82-7046-050-8.
