= Yugoslav People's Army =

Armed forces of Yugoslavia (1945–1992)

- Југословенска народна армија Jugoslavenska narodna armija Jugoslovanska ljudska armada
- Emblem (1951–1991) Emblem during the breakup of Yugoslavia (1991–1992)
- Founded: 1 March 1945; 81 years ago
- Disbanded: 20 May 1992; 34 years ago
- Service branches: Yugoslav Ground Forces (KoV); Yugoslav Navy (JRM); Yugoslav Air Force (RViPVO); Territorial Defense (TO)
- Headquarters: Belgrade, Serbia, Yugoslavia

Leadership
- Commander-in-Chief: Marshal Josip Broz Tito (1945–1980); President of the Presidency of Yugoslavia (1980–1992)
- Minister of Defense: See list
- Chief of the General Staff: See list

Personnel
- Military age: 15–65
- Conscription: 18
- Active personnel: c. 275,341 (1990)
- Reserve personnel: 783,037 (1990)

Related articles
- History: Royal Yugoslav Army; Yugoslav Partisans
- Ranks: Yugoslav People's Army ranks

The Yugoslav People's Army (JNA/ЈНА (Note: Macedonian and Serbian: Југословенска народна армија, Jugoslovenska narodna armija; Croatian and Bosnian: Jugoslavenska narodna armija; Slovene: Jugoslovanska ljudska armada, JLA)), also called the Yugoslav National Army, was the military of the Socialist Federal Republic of Yugoslavia and its antecedents from its founding in 1945 to its breakup in 1992. The branches consisted of the Ground Forces, Navy, Air Force and Territorial Defense.

The President of the Republic (the Presidency after Tito's death) acted as commander-in-chief of the armed forces, while administration and defence policy was carried out by the Government through the Ministry of Defence. The highest operational authority, in charge of the deployment and preparation of the armed forces in peace and war, was the General Staff. Military service was compulsory for all men.

Following the disintegration of the state, the JNA ceased to exist in 1992 amidst the conflicts of the Yugoslav Wars, and the units stationed in their respective republics formed their owned respective armed forces, while the remnants of the JNA in Serbia and Montenegro, became part of the new Yugoslav Army.

== Origins ==
The military was formed in March 1945 as the Yugoslav Army (Note: Bosnian and Croatian: Jugoslavenska armija; Macedonian and Serbian Cyrillic: Југословенска армија / Serbian: Jugoslovenska armija; Slovene: Jugoslovanska armada; JA) on the organizational framework of the People's Liberation Army of Yugoslavia (NOVJ), the anti-fascist resistance movement which liberated the country from the Axis powers during World War II in Yugoslavia. It was renamed Yugoslav People's Army on 22 December 1951, the tenth anniversary of the 1st Proletarian Brigade's establishment. This date was officially celebrated as the "Day of the Army" in the Federative People's Republic of Yugoslavia, later the Socialist Federal Republic of Yugoslavia (FPR / SFR Yugoslavia).

The support the Soviets had within JNA ranks during the Informbiro period, after 1948, is contested. Low-end estimates indicate that 10–15% of the army's personnel favoured the Soviet position. Yugoslav sources estimate the number of military members arrested ranged from 4,153 officers and soldiers (estimated by Radonjić), to 7,000 imprisoned officers estimated by Milovan Đilas. The purge included 22 officers in the presidential guard regiment reporting directly to Josip Broz Tito, including Momčilo Đurić, wartime commander of the Yugoslav Partisan Supreme Headquarters escort battalion. During this period of Soviet blockade, the Yugoslav Army's development stagnated.

Forty-nine Yugoslav Army graduates of the General Staff Academy, the Frunze Academy, and other Soviet military academies were deemed potential Soviet supporters. Many of those attending such academies in the USSR at the time of the Tito–Stalin split never returned to Yugoslavia.

The split particularly affected the Air Force. Almost all Air Force officers had Soviet training, and some of them fled Yugoslavia in Air Force planes. The defectors included Major General Pero Popivoda, who was the head of the Air Force operational service. The Batajnica, Zemun, and Pančevo airbases near Belgrade saw several attacks by groups of saboteurs. The Zemun airbase commander and his deputy fled to Romania.

Between 1948 and 1955, the United States gave Yugoslavia US$600 million in direct military grants and an equal amount in economic aid, enabling Yugoslavia to devote more of its domestic resources to defence. Following a shift of United States policy to "all-out support" for Yugoslavia, on 17 November 1949, the National Security Council pledged to help Yugoslavia defend against invasions.

By 1951, Yugoslav authorities became convinced that a Soviet attack was inevitable and Yugoslavia joined the Mutual Defense Assistance Program (MDAP). Shortly before Yugoslavia joined the MDAP, the Yugoslav military held an exercise near Banja Luka in 1951 which hosted US observers, including the Chief of Staff of the United States Army General J. Lawton Collins. In November, the United States provided aid under the MDAP and successfully persuaded the British and French to sell arms to Yugoslavia. The United States provided a large quantity of military hardware; the bulk of the equipment was given to the Army. The Yugoslav Air Force was particularly low on equipment in 1951, but within two years it received 25 Lockheed T-33As, and 167 Republic F-84 Thunderjets. In view of the defence cooperation, the United States Forces in Austria proposed a plan for joint American-Yugoslav defence against Soviet advances from Hungary to Austria through Slovenia, but such plans were never approved.

After two visits to the United States by Colonel General Koča Popović and Colonel General Milo Kilibarda in May–June and August 1951, respectively, U.S. weaponry began arriving by late 1951. By 1952 the Armed Forces had grown to 500,000 troops, and defence expenditures consumed 22 percent of the gross national product. A Military Assistance Advisory Group (MAAG) of 30 officers commanded by Brigadier General John W. Harmony was established by the United States in Belgrade in 1951. It operated for ten years, disbursing military grants and arranging another US$1 billion in arms sales on favorable terms. Among weapons transferred were 599 M-4A3 tanks, 319 M-47 tanks, 715 M-7, M-18, and M-36 self-propelled guns, 565 M-3A1 and M-8 armored cars, and a total of 760 105mm, 155mm, and 203mm artillery pieces. The artillery pieces delivered were used to reequip artillery units within Yugoslavia's eight divisions.

== Task and command structure ==
Under the constitution and laws of SFR Yugoslavia, the Yugoslav People's Army was a part of the armed forces with the Territorial Defense as the joint armed forces of all working people and citizens of Yugoslavia. The main task of the Yugoslav People's Army was to protect the independence, sovereignty, territorial integrity and social organization of the Socialist Federal Republic of Yugoslavia.

Though the Presidency of Yugoslavia was the supreme commander of the armed forces and in command of Yugoslav People's Army, some duties from the presidency could be given to the Secretary of Defence. The Secretary of Defence was the officer with the highest military rank that could command the armed forces, including the Yugoslav People's Army and Territorial Defense. The President of Yugoslavia had the power to promote members of the military to the highest military ranks such as general or admiral, and to relieve duty of the highest military officers. The Chief of Staff of the Yugoslav People's Army, in the case that the Secretary of Defense was prevented or absent to fulfill his function, was formally his deputy who could take command of the armed forces. In 1987, under decree of the Presidency of Yugoslavia, the General Staff of the JNA was renamed to the General Staff of the Armed Forces of Yugoslavia, thus effectively giving command of JNA and the TO to one military body in order to more efficiently command the armed forces in case of war, according to the law of "All-people's defense" from 1982.

== Organization ==
A medley of marches for the Air Force, the Navy and the Ground Forces

=== Structure and organization (late 1980s – early 1990s) ===
In the mid-1980s, plans were made under plan "Jedinstvo" for a change from republic armies and divisions to military districts and brigades to allow for easier federal consolidation of the republics' territorial armies, particularly in the case of a crisis. Because of internal and external security changes during that time, "Jedinstvo" was later modeled in three parts: "Jedinstvo 1", "Jedinstvo 2", and "Jedinstvo 3", starting from 1987 (with a planned completion date of 1995) for the JNA to start major reform.

The first part of the JNA's major overhaul under "Jedinstvo 1" had its basic force structure nearly completed in 1989. Wartime manpower was planned to be reduced to about 1 million, while peacetime strength was limited to 299,057 personnel, including officers, soldiers and civilian workers. Equipment purchases were not fully realized.

After "Jedinstvo 1", the JNA consisted of the Ground Forces, Air Force and Navy. Under the "Jedinstvo" plan, the army's structure would be reorganized into four major military regions (Vojne Oblasti) under the command of the Federal Secretariat of People's Defence (SSNO). These military regions were further divided into corps, brigades, garrisons and smaller sectors that were responsible for administrative tasks such as draft registration, mobilization, and construction and maintenance of military facilities. The regions were:

- The First Military Region with headquarters in Belgrade (responsible for eastern Croatia, northern and central parts of Serbia and parts of Bosnia and Herzegovina)
- The Third Military Region with headquarters in Skopje (Macedonia, Southern Serbia and Montenegro)
- The Fifth Military Region with headquarters in Zagreb (Slovenia and northern Croatia)
- The Military-Naval Region "Vojnopomorska Oblast" with its headquarters in Split. It included parts of Croatia, Bosnia and Herzegovina and Montenegro – almost all Yugoslavia's coastline. It had subdivisions on three sectors including flotilla and one corps.

Directly under SSNO were the Guard's motorized brigade, school centers, three SIGNAL regiments, a light anti-aircraft artillery regiment, and a few independent battalions and divisions.

In the "Jedinstvo 1" reforms, JNA eliminated most of its old divisional infantry organization and established the brigade and corps structure with some independent units under direct command of SSNO. Territorial defense was also changed and laws and the constitution were amended to address those changes. The Ground Forces "converted ten of twelve infantry divisions into twenty-nine tank, mechanized and mountain infantry brigades with integral artillery, air defense and anti-tank regiments under corps structure. One airborne brigade was organized before 1990. The shift to brigade-level organization provided greater operational flexibility, maneuverability, and tactical initiative and reduced the possibility that large army units would be destroyed in set piece engagements with an aggressor. The change created many senior field command positions that would develop relatively young and talented officers." In 1989, five independent divisions under general staff command and 25 partisan (reserve) divisions under corps command were formed including many other battalions, regiments and batteries under different commands.

The 1989 plan "Jedinstvo 2" commenced and border battalions were transferred under corps command including some divisions that have remained before under others commands. Brigades got some artillery and antiaircraft batteries under their direct command that helped them to gain independence in wartime from higher levels. Defense of all major cities was previously planned with separate units but under "Jedinstvo 2" only Belgrade and Zagreb retained separated units for defense of their cities.

There were usually three classes of brigades, regiments and battalions:

- A. class
- B. class
- R. class

A. class brigades and battalions were more than 60 to up to 100% manned, and B. class units had 15–60% manpower. R. class units were reserved with about 15–20% and was manned mostly in their logistic units and commands. Battalions with A. class status were 100% manned and equipped. A. class brigades had a brigade HQ and 4 battalions and B class brigade had 2–3 battalions with HQ.

The "Jedinstvo 3" plan started in 1990. To the military leadership of the JNA, it was obvious that USSR was moving to defend its internal borders and the only global superpower left was the USA. It was then agreed in JNA that potential for aggression from the Warsaw Pact had diminished but potential aggression from NATO had increased. The new plan "Jedinstvo 3" included changes to organize better defenses from new perceived external threats. The plan required the building of smaller but more modernized forces with highly mobile units. Corps closer to the border would have two A. class brigades including an artillery regiment of A. class, an anti-armor regiment of B. class and an engineering battalion of A class. Corps deeper inside country would have one brigade of A. or B. class.

Under "Jedinstvo 3" every corps in the Air Force should have one support aviation brigade, one fighter wing, one Air Surveillance, Early Warning and Guidance regiment, 1–2 rocket brigades or regiments and rest up to possibilities to equip.

Under "Jedinstvo 2", the JNA on 1 January 1990 had:

- 5 divisions – 2 R. and 3 B. class
- 23 partisans divisions of R. class
- 72 partisans brigade of R. class
- 20 infantry brigades – 2 A., 10 B. and 8 R. class
- 17 infantry regiments – 5 B. 12. R. class
- 7 hill brigades – 3 B. 4 R. class
- 1 mountain brigade B. class
- 32 motorized brigades – 4 A., 21 B. and 7. R. class
- 2 marines infantries brigades B. class
- 1 Guards motorized brigade A. class
- 6 Armor brigades of B. class
- 11 Guards Mechanized brigades – 7. A. class, 3. B. class and 1 R. class
- 1 artillery rocket brigade B. class
- 6 mixed artillery brigades B. class
- 5 mixed anti-armor artillery brigades B. class

and many others, including 19 military police battalions and river flotilla giving in total 28 divisions, 307 brigades and regiments and 137 independent battalions/divisions.

Under "Jedinstvo 3" until 1995, the structure of the JNA was:

- 1 Guards Mechanized division in A. class
- 18 Partisans divisions of R. class
- 7. Motorized brigades of R.class
- 39 motorized brigades – 7 A. class
- 17 mechanized brigades – 15 A. and 2 R. class

There were other units that had smaller but more modern and mobile forces with more mobile A class units with a total of 19 divisions, 234. brigades and 104 independent battalions/regiments in 1995. Total manpower at the end of 1995 was about 222.151 in peace and 834.891 in war.

Internal changes in Yugoslavia prevented the total realization of the "Jedinstvo 3" plan. While many changes under it were done during 1990, not all were finished completely. While most commands and units were formed and manned, equipping was not finished according to plan because of dissolution of Yugoslavia and stopping of deliveries from most of domestic factories to units of JNA. As part of the armed forces, there was also the Territorial Defense, based on each republic's territory that formed Yugoslavia that would fall under command of JNA during wartime.

=== Ground Forces ===
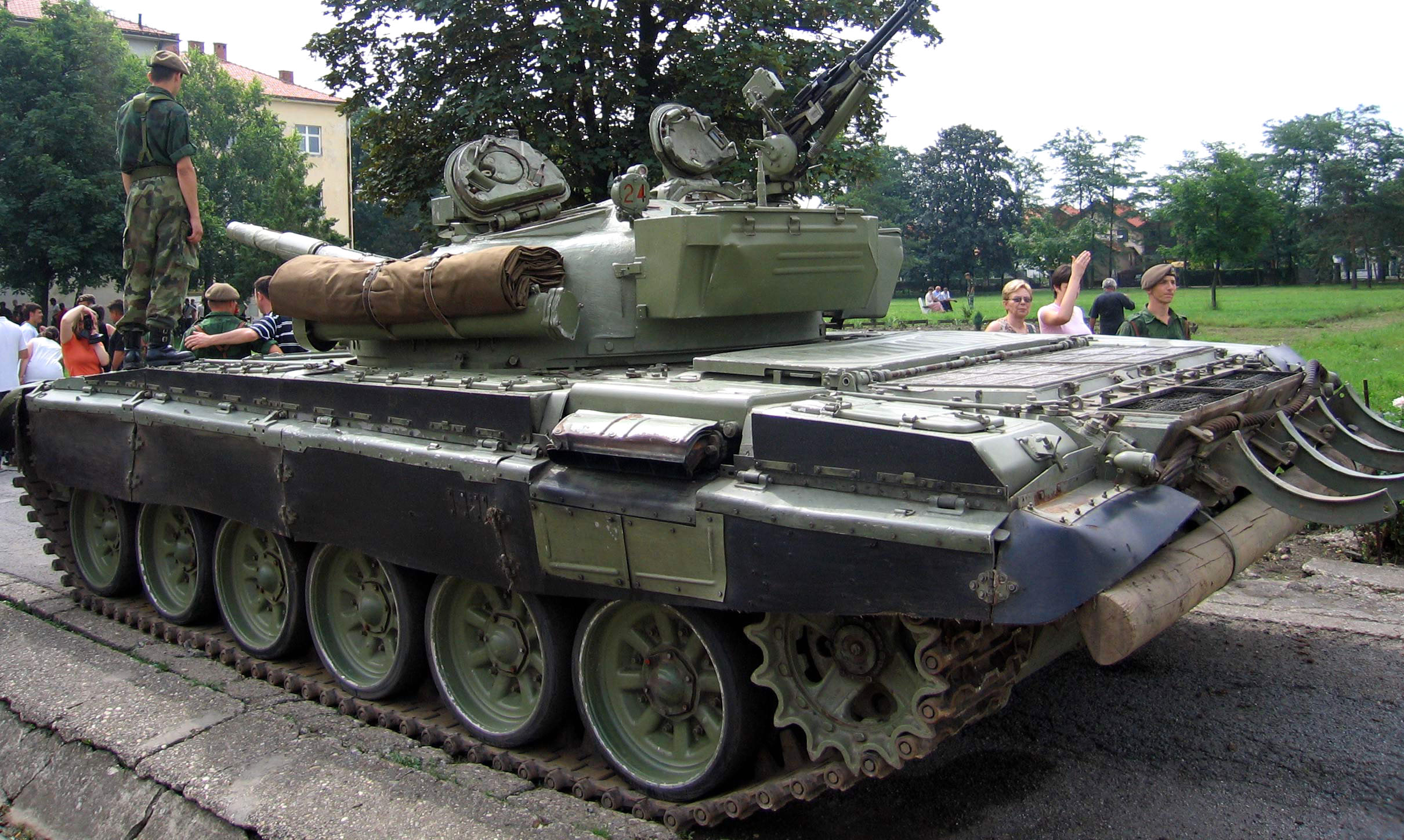
Yugoslav-built M-84 tank

The Ground Forces had the greatest number of personnel. In 1991 there were about 140,000 active-duty soldiers (including 90,000 conscripts), and over a million trained reservists that could be mobilized in wartime. Each of the Yugoslav constituent six republics had its own Territorial Defence forces which were similar to the US national guard and were subordinate to supreme command as an integral part of the defence system in wartime. The territorial defence (reserve force) was made up of former conscripts; they were occasionally called up for war exercises.

In accordance with the 1974 Yugoslav Constitution the Land Forces were divided into six armies allocated to the five republics. The ground forces were organised into infantry, armour, artillery, and air defence, as well as signal, engineering and chemical defence corps.

=== Air Force ===
The Yugoslav Air Force had about 32,000 personnel including 4,000 conscripts, and operated over 400 aircraft and 200 helicopters. It was responsible for transport, reconnaissance and rotary-wing aircraft as well as the national air defence system. The primary air force missions were to contest enemy efforts to establish air supremacy over Yugoslavia and to support the defensive operations of the ground forces and navy. Most aircraft were produced in Yugoslavia. Missiles were produced domestically and supplied by the Soviet Union.

The Yugoslav Air Force had twelve squadrons of domestically produced ground attack fighters. The ground attack squadrons provided close air support to ground force operations. They were equipped with 165 new Soko J-22 Orao, Super Galeb and J-21 Jastreb, and older Soko J-20 Kraguj fighters. Many ground attack fighters were armed with AGM-65 Maverick air-to-surface missiles purchased from the United States. Others were armed with Soviet Kh-23 and Kh-28 missiles. The air force also had about ninety armed Mi-8 helicopter gunships to provide added mobility and fire support for small ground units. A large number of reconnaissance aircraft were available to support ground forces operations. Four squadrons of seventy Galeb, Jastreb, and Orao-1 fighters were configured for reconnaissance missions.

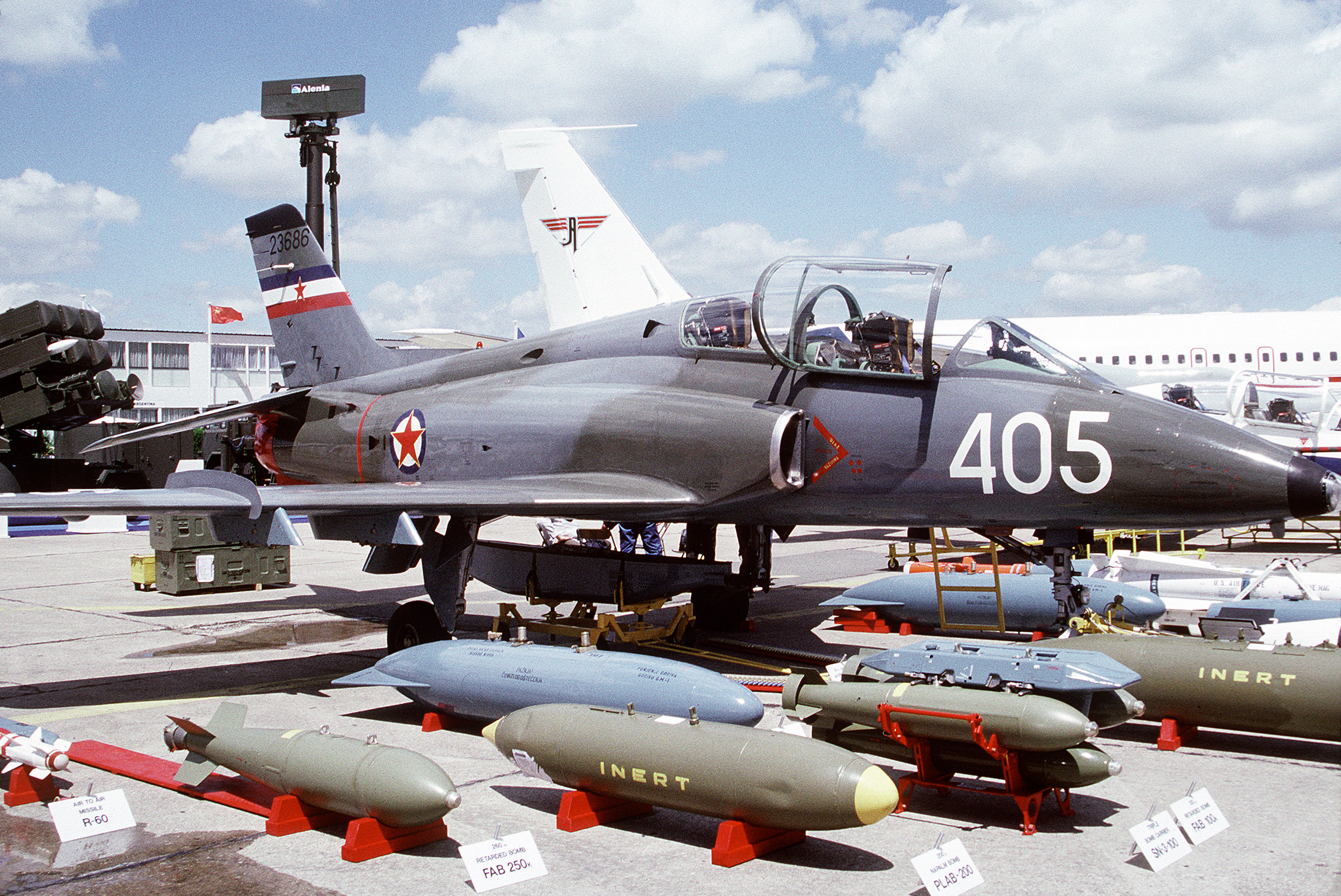
The Yugoslav G-4 SOKO Super Galeb

The Yugoslav Air Force had nine squadrons of 130 Soviet-made MiG-21 interceptors for air defence. First produced in the late 1950s, the MiG-21 design was largely obsolete in 1990 and represented a potential weakness in Yugoslavia's air defence. However, the bulk of the MiG-21 fleet consisted mainly of the bis variant, the latest production MiG-21 model, and was armed with the Soviet Vympel K-13 (NATO reporting name: AA-2 "Atoll") missile, air-to-air missiles and some Molniya R-60 (NATO reporting name: AA-8 "Aphid") missiles as well as twin 30 mm cannons. By 1989, Yugoslavia started developing a new domestic multirole fighter plane called Novi Avion, which was supposed to replace the MiG-21 and J-21 Jastreb fleets entirely. The design of the new aircraft was influenced by the Mirage 2000 and Dassault Rafale fighter types and it was to enter service by the early 2000s. As an interim solution, a modernization package was planned for the MiG-21 and it is speculated that India's MiG-21 Bison upgrade was actually intended for Yugoslav aircraft. In 1987, Yugoslavia acquired 16 MiG-29s.

Although not officially known at the time, Yugoslavia was rumoured to have been interested in the purchase of Su-25 attack-aircraft and Mi-24 gunships. Instead of developing its own fighter plane, the Novi Avion, the country made a request to licence-build the F-20, but due to unstable relations with the US, the request was rejected. By the late 1980s, the licensed production of Aérospatiale SA 330 Puma helicopters was also planned, but due to the dissolution of the country, it was not continued.

One of the structures operated by the Yugoslav Air Force was the underground Željava Air Base near the town of Bihać in northwest Bosnia and Herzegovina. The structure was made to withstand a nuclear explosion and was destroyed by the JNA in 1992 to prevent its capture. Željava was home to the 117th Fighter Aviation Regiment, which was composed of the 124th and 125th Fighter Squadrons, equipped with MiG-21Bis fighters, and the 352nd Reconnaissance Squadron, equipped with MiG-21R aircraft.

The Air and Air Defence Forces were headquartered at Zemun and had fighter and bomber aircraft, helicopters, and air defence artillery units at air bases throughout the former Yugoslavia: Batajnica Air Base (Belgrade), Niš Constantine the Great Airport, Slatina Air Base (Priština), Golubovci Airbase (Titograd), Skopski Petrovec, Sarajevo, Mostar, Željava Air Base (Bihać), Pleso (Zagreb), Split Airport, Pula, Zemunik (Zadar), Cerklje ob Krki and many other smaller air bases.

=== Navy ===
Minor surface combatants operated by the Yugoslav Navy included nearly eighty frigates, corvettes, submarines, minesweepers, and missile, torpedo, and patrol boats in the Adriatic Fleet. The entire coast of Yugoslavia was part of the naval region headquartered at Split, Croatia.

The Partisans had operated many small boats in raids harassing Italian convoys in the Adriatic Sea during World War II. After the war, the navy operated numerous German and Italian submarines, destroyers, minesweepers, and tank-landing craft captured during the war or received as war reparations. The United States provided eight torpedo boats in the late 1940s, but most of them were soon obsolete. The navy was upgraded in the 1960s when it acquired ten Osa-I-class missile boats and four Shershen-class torpedo boats from the Soviet Union. The Soviets granted a license to build eleven additional Shershen units in Yugoslav shipyards developed for this purpose.

In 1980 and 1982, the Yugoslav navy took the delivery of two Soviet Koni-class frigates. In 1988 it completed two additional units under license. The Koni frigates were armed with four Soviet P-15 Termit surface-to-surface missile launchers, twin 9K33 Osa (NATO reporting name: SA-8 "Gecko") surface-to-air missiles, and anti-submarine rocket launchers.

The Yugoslav navy developed its own submarine-building capability during the 1960s. In 1990, the main combat units of the submarine service were three Heroj-class submarines armed with 533 mm torpedoes. Two smaller Sava-class submarines entered service in the late 1970s. Two Sutjeska-class submarines had been relegated mainly to training missions by 1990. At that time the navy had apparently shifted to construction of versatile midget submarines. Four Una-class midgets and four Mala-class swimmer delivery vehicles were in service in the late 1980s. They were built for use by underwater demolition teams and special forces. The Una-class boats carried five crewmen, eight combat swimmers, four Mala vehicles, and limpet mines. The Mala vehicles carried two swimmers and 250 kilograms (550 lb) of mines.

The Yugoslav navy operated ten Osa-class missile boats and six Končar-class missile boats. The Osa I boats were armed with four P-15 Termit surface-to-surface missile launchers. In 1990, ten domestic Kobra missile boats were scheduled to begin replacing the Osa I class. The Kobra class was to be armed with eight Swedish RBS-15 anti-ship missiles, and fifteen of them were ordered in late 1989. Armed with two P-15 Termit launchers, the Končar-class boats were modeled after the Spica class, and there were plans to upgrade them with Swedish-built missiles. Two Kobra missile boats were built by Croatia as the Kralj-class fast attack craft and both are still in service. The navy's fifteen Topčider-class torpedo boats included four former Soviet Shershen class and eleven Yugoslav built units.

The Yugoslav navy's mine warfare and countermeasures capabilities were considered adequate in 1990. It operated four Vukov Klanac-class coastal minesweepers built on a French design, four British Ham-class minesweepers, and six 117-class inshore minesweepers built in domestic shipyards. Larger numbers of older and less capable minesweepers were mainly used in riverine operations. Other older units were used as dedicated minelayers. The navy used amphibious landing craft in support of army operations in the area of the Danube, Sava, and Drava rivers. They included both tank and assault landing craft. In 1990, there were four 501-class, ten 211-class, and twenty-five 601-class landing craft in service. Most of them were also capable of laying mines in rivers and coastal areas.

The Yugoslav Navy had 10,000 sailors (including 4,400 conscripts and 900 marines). They were essentially a coastal defence force with the mission of preventing enemy amphibious landings along the country's rugged 4,000-kilometer shoreline and coastal islands, and contesting enemy blockade or control of the strategic Strait of Otranto. The entire coast of Yugoslavia was part of the naval region headquartered at Split. The naval region was divided into three smaller naval districts and a riverine flotilla with major naval bases located at Split, Šibenik, Pula, Ploče and Kotor on the Adriatic Sea, and Novi Sad on the River Danube. The strategic islands of Vis and Lastovo were heavily fortified and unauthorised entry was prohibited. The fleet was organized into missile, torpedo, and patrol boat brigades, a submarine division, and minesweeper flotillas. The naval order of battle included four frigates, three corvettes, five patrol submarines, fifty-eight missile, torpedo, and patrol boats, and twenty-eight minesweepers. One antisubmarine warfare helicopter squadron was based at Split on the Adriatic coast. It employed Soviet Ka-25, Ka-28, and Mi-14 helicopters, and domestic Partisan helicopters. Some air force fighter and reconnaissance squadrons supported naval operations.

=== Military education and composition ===
The Yugoslav Constitution of 1974 principally tried to have the most proportional representation of Yugoslavia's republics and autonomous provinces in the high army ranks. It is defined in article 242 of the constitution, which says that, "Regarding the composition of staff and the employment in the high command and leadership functions in the Yugoslav People's Army the principle is applied of as proportional representation as possible of republics and autonomous provinces".

Serbs, Montenegrins, and Yugoslavs were by some opinions over-represented in the officer corps, but that was still in accordance with cited constitution. JNA's high-ranking positions in 1980 was dominated by ethnic Serbs, including the chief of the armed forces, minister of defense and secretary of the LCY in the JNA. Nobody was preventing anyone in Yugoslavia to become JNA officer in accordance to the law "Zakon o vojnim školama i naučnoistraživačkim ustanovama Jugoslovenske narodne armije" that had no exclusions clause. Proportional presentations was to be between republics and autonomous provinces according to cited part of constitution and not between nations. Military schools in Yugoslavia in accordance with law about military schools were built in all Yugoslavia Republics. In Bosnia and Herzegovina and Croatia, military schools possessed 38,391 annual capacity or 50.54% of the total compared to Serbia, which had 30,843 capacity for educating military personnel that constituted about 40.62% of total capacity and rest was among other republics.

Representation of the main nations and nationalities of Yugoslavia in the general population and the armed forces:

In Yugoslavia 1981	In Active Army Staff 1985	Among Officers 1981	Among Recruits 1989	
Serbians	39.7%	57.17%	60.0%	31%
Croatians	22.1%	12.51%	12.6%	18.52%
Yugoslavs	1.3%	n.a.	6.7%	7%
Macedonians	5.81%	6.74%	6.3%	6.11%
Montenegrins	2.5%	5,82%	6,2%	2.48%
Slovenes	8.2%	2.64%	2.8%	7%
Bosnians	8.4%	3.65%	2.4%	12%
Hungarians	2.3%	n.a.	0.7%	1%
Albanians	6.4%	1.09%	0.6%	9%
Others	3.3%	n.a.	1.6%	6%

Ethnic distribution among higher ranks of the JNA:

Nations	Generals	Colonels	Lieutenant Colonels	Majors
Serbs	50.3%	64.5%	63.5%	60%
Croats	14.4%	9.4%	10.8%	10.4%
Montenegrins	12.4%	11%	6.7%	6.4%
Macedonians	7.8%	4.4%	6.4%	6.7%
Slovenes	7.8%	3.1%	2.3%	1.9%
Yugoslavs	4.6%	5.3%	6.9%	10.3%
Bosniaks	2%	1.2%	1.8%	2.3%
Albanians	0.7%	0.2%	0.2%	0.2%
Hungarians	0%	0.3%	0.2%	0.4%
Others	0%	0.8%	1.3%	1.3%

=== Anniversaries and rewards ===
22 December was established as the Yugoslav People's Army Day. On that day all units and organizations within JNA including other Yugoslavia states bodies celebrated the day the JNA was founded. Prestigious awards were given on that day: they were called dvadesetdrugi decembar. Rewards were given to anyone who had contributed to the defence of Yugoslavia in some way including military, scientific, economic or another contribution. Winners of such awards were highly praised in media and among the populace. Every ten years, special medals were awarded on 22 December. It was last promoted by the JNA general, the winner of the 22 December reward and JNA silver star medal. Major general Ener Taso died on 12 December 2018.

== Industry ==
Defence industry played a central role in the Yugoslav economy and political system. SR Bosnia and Herzegovina hosted over 40% of the federal defence industry, including the majority of its small arms production. With annual exports of $3 billion, it was twice as large as the second largest industry, tourism.

Several companies in Yugoslavia produced airplanes and combat aircraft, most notably SOKO of Mostar, with the Soko J-22 Orao being its best known product. There was also Zastava Arms for firearms and artillery. Another important manufacturer was Utva in Serbia. The Yugoslav military–industrial complex produced tanks (most notably, the M-84), armored vehicles (BOV APC, BVP M-80), various artillery pieces (mortars, multiple rocket launchers, howitzers), anti-aircraft weapons, as well as various types of infantry weapons and other equipment.

== Infrastructure ==
JNA had modern infrastructure with many air bases including underground shelters and command and control centers in many locations including several mountains. The biggest and best known installation was the Željava Air Base, also known as the Bihać Underground Integrated Radar Control and Surveillance Centre and Air Base, in Bosnia and Herzegovina.

== Oath ==
The oath of the JNA was:

I (name and surname) solemnly undertake to faithfully serve my people, defend my homeland, the Socialist Federal Republic of Yugoslavia, preserve the brotherhood and unity of our peoples and the honor of the JNA, and conscientiously carry out the orders of my commanders. I will always be ready to fight for the freedom and honor of the Motherland, in this fight I will give my life without regret.

== Doctrine ==
The JNA adopted the concept of total defence (as did a number of other small European and neutral countries). Yugoslavia based its defence doctrine upon the total war concept of "Total People's Defence" (sh. Opštenarodna odbrana / Općenarodna obrana) which drew upon Yugoslavia's successful partisan history during the Yugoslav People's Liberation War during the Second World War. "TND prepared the entire population to contest the occupation of the country and finally to liberate it. The Territorial Defence Forces would mobilize the population for this purpose. The combat readiness of the TDF meant that the steps of organization and training could be bypassed after the start of hostilities. The TDF would supplement the YPA, giving it greater defensive depth and an armed local population ready to support combat actions." The entire Yugoslav population was to be engaged in armed resistance, armaments production, and civil defence under this concept. It was believed by the Yugoslav planners to be the best method by which a smaller nation could properly defend itself against a much stronger invader, specifically, NATO or the Warsaw Pact.

=== Dissolution ===
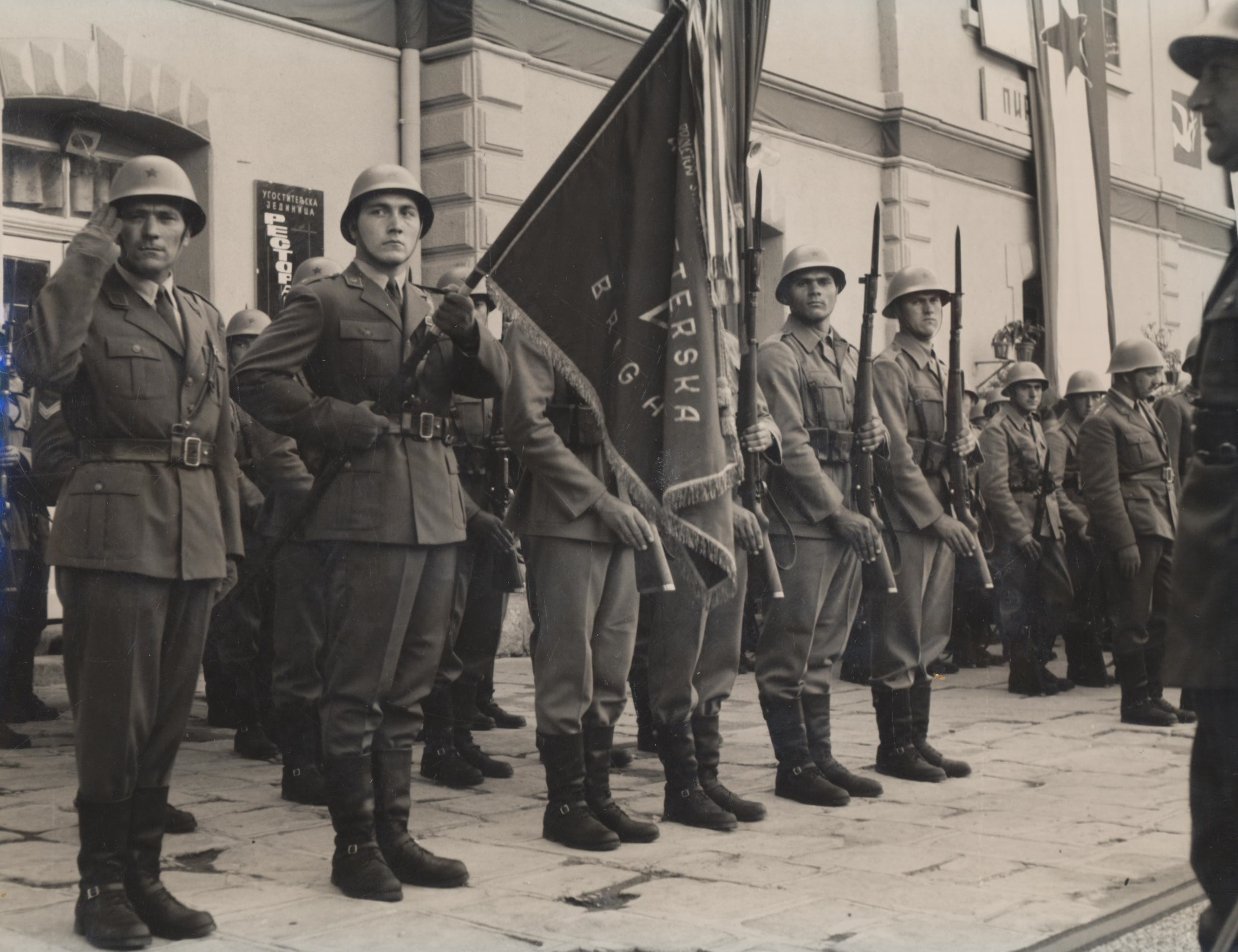
Welcoming Tito in Pirot, 1965

In January 1990, the League of Communists of Yugoslavia was effectively dissolved as a national organization following its 14th Congress where the Serbian and Slovene delegations engaged in a public confrontation. The Yugoslav People's Army was left without an ideological support mechanism. 99% of the officers of the Army were members of the communist party.

The dissolution of Yugoslavia began when independent, non-communist governments were established in the Yugoslav republics of Slovenia, Croatia, Bosnia and Herzegovina, and Macedonia. In 1990, the Socialist Republic of Slovenia changed its name to Republic of Slovenia and ceased contributing funds to the federal government for a sustained military budget. Soon afterward the Slovene government began a re-organization of its territorial defense, bringing the former constituent republic's Territorial Defense reserve forces under its control as the Slovenian Territorial Defence.

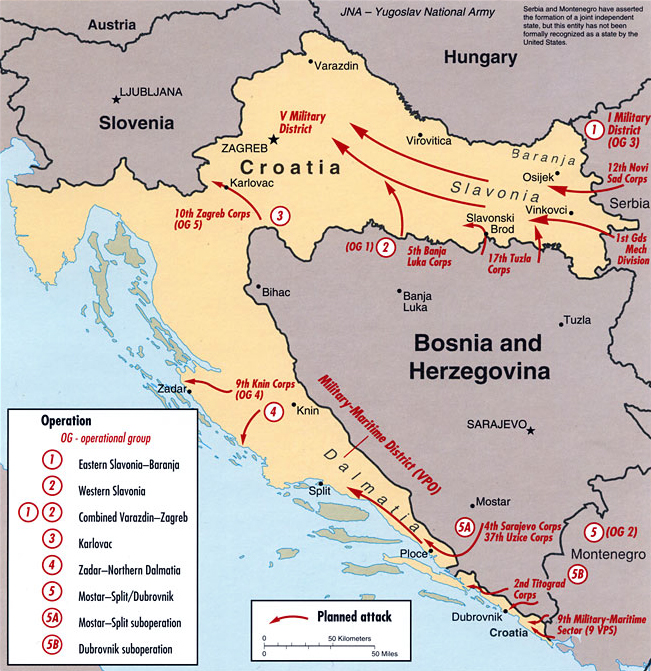
Map of the Yugoslav strategic offensive plan in 1991 as interpreted by the Central Intelligence Agency

In March 1991, Yugoslav defense minister General Veljko Kadijević organized a meeting at the military complex in Topčider, Belgrade. Present at this meeting were all 6 presidents of the Yugoslav republics, presidents of the autonomous republics, the Yugoslav president and all top military officers. Kadijević claimed that there were numerous paramilitary organizations in Yugoslavia sponsored by foreign and domestic enemies of the state. He stated that if federal and republic officials "failed to ensure peace, the Yugoslav armed forces could efficiently do so themselves." Kadijević proposed a declaration of martial law. A subsequent vote was held on Kadijević's recommendation of martial law, and the suggestion was vetoed.

In April 1991, the government of Croatia formed the Croatian National Guard (ZNG), which the Yugoslav People's Army considered to be a paramilitary organization. On 25 June 1991, Slovenia and Croatia declared their independence from Yugoslavia. On the same day, Slovenian Territorial Defence units captured Yugoslav control posts on the borders with Italy, Hungary and Austria. Slovene forces also established border control posts on their border with Croatia.

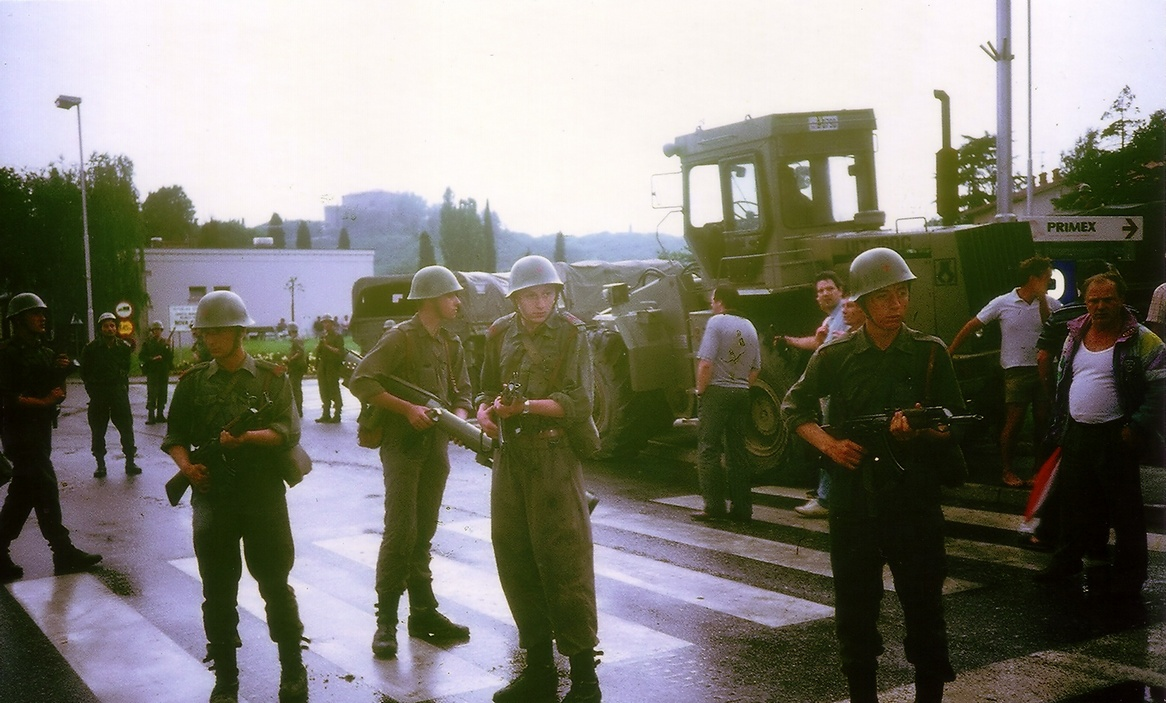
Soldiers of the Yugoslav People's Army and civilians before clash of arms in Rožna Dolina in 1991

As a result of these actions, on 27 June 1991 the JNA attacked Slovenia, with its top commanders citing the constitutional obligation to defend the sovereignty and territorial integrity of Yugoslavia. Yugoslav forces attacked the Slovene units on the border and in all other areas under Slovene control. The Slovenian Territorial Defence blockaded all ten Yugoslav bases in Slovenia and kept them under siege in the Ten-Day War which ended on 6 July 1991. Yugoslav forces had 44 killed and 146 wounded, with many Yugoslav officers being wounded or captured. After the Brioni Agreement was signed, the JNA agreed to withdraw from Slovenia by 10 October 1991, leaving large amounts of equipment behind.

On 27 June 1991, war in Croatia began. The JNA and the Serbians were on one side and Croatian military units on the other. On 14–15 September, Croatia launched the Battle of the Barracks, besieging over 20 Yugoslav People's Army barracks and depots, leaving Yugoslav soldiers without food, water or electricity for weeks. Some Croatian citizens deserted from the JNA and began joining Croatian military forces. Senior Yugoslav officers also defected to Croatia, including Air Force Commander-in-Chief Colonel general Anton Tus. In August 1991, the Battle of Vukovar began. It was the biggest battle in Croatia before Operation Storm and Operation Flash. In the battle, 90% of the city was destroyed. The Yugoslav People's Army used fighter and attack aircraft, rocket launchers, a large number of tanks and other equipment.

Macedonia declared independence on 8 September 1991, but the Yugoslav People's Army did not militarily respond. In November, Vukovar was captured and 80% of Croatian forces were destroyed or captured. Many atrocities were committed in the city by the Yugoslav People's Army and local Serb guerrillas and regulars, including the Velepromet concentration camp, Vukovar massacre, etc.

In mid-October 1991, Yugoslav ground forces, supported by naval and air forces, attacked the city of Dubrovnik and the Konavle area where the Croats had strongholds, starting the Siege of Dubrovnik. By 6 December, Yugoslav forces had neutralized all Croat formations in the Konavle area, but Dubrovnik had not been captured. After these two operations, the JNA signed the Sarajevo Agreement with Croatia and began to withdraw. In January 1992, Veljko Kadijević resigned after the 1992 European Community Monitor Mission helicopter downing.

The JNA left Macedonia in March 1992. Around the same time, Bosnia and Herzegovina declared independence following a referendum and the Bosnian War started soon thereafter between the country's Bosniaks, Croats and Serbs. The JNA officially withdrew from Bosnia and Herzegovina in May 1992. In January 1992, Bosnian Serb state was declared. Later renamed Republika Srpska, it developed its own military as the JNA withdrew and handed over its weapons, equipment and 55,000 troops to the newly created Bosnian Serb army. On 20 May 1992 the JNA was formally dissolved, the remnants of which reformed into the military of the newly founded Federal Republic of Yugoslavia.

== Peacekeeping operations ==
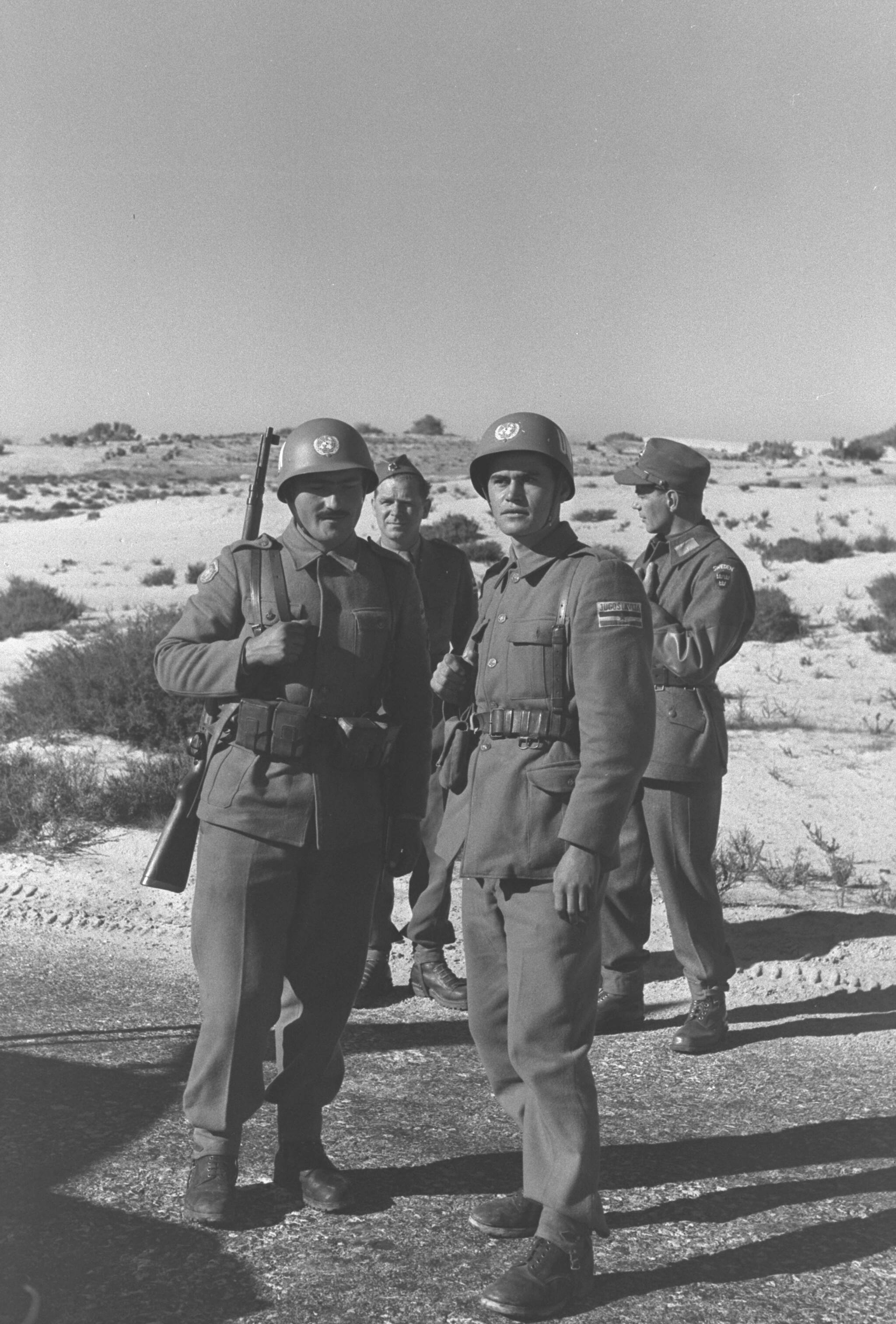
Yugoslav soldiers in the Sinai Peninsula as part of the UN Emergency Force, January 1957

- United Nations Emergency Force (1956–1967) – 14,265 soldiers in 22 rotations, Colonel Lazar Mušicki as acting commander of mission (August 1964 – January 1965)
- United Nations Yemen Observation Mission (1963–1964) – one squad, Colonel Branko Pavlović acting as commander and chief of staff.
- United Nations Iran–Iraq Military Observer Group (1988–1991) – military observers, General Slavko Jović as commander of mission
- United Nations Transition Assistance Group (1989–1990) – military observers
- United Nations Angola Verification Mission I (1989–1991) – military observers

== Successor militaries of the former Yugoslavia ==
- Bosnia and Herzegovina: Armed Forces of Bosnia and Herzegovina
- Croatia: Armed Forces of Croatia
- North Macedonia: Army of North Macedonia
- Serbia and Montenegro: Armed Forces of Serbia and Montenegro
  - Montenegro: Armed Forces of Montenegro
  - Serbia: Serbian Armed Forces
    - Kosovo: Kosovo Force, Kosovo Security Force
- Slovenia: Slovenian Armed Forces

== Operational experience ==
- World War II in Yugoslavia
- Albanian–Yugoslav border conflict
- Trieste crisis
- Bugojno group
- Yugoslav Wars
  - Ten-Day War in Slovenia (1991)
  - Croatian War of Independence (1991)
  - Bosnian War (1992)

== See also ==
- Yugoslav Partisans
- OZNA
- Counterintelligence Service
- League of Communists Organization in the Yugoslav People's Army

== Literature ==
- Banac, Ivo (1988). With Stalin Against Tito: Cominformist Splits in Yugoslav Communism. Cornell University Press. ISBN 0-8014-2186-1.
- Brands, Henry W. Jr (1987). "Redefining the Cold War: American Policy toward Yugoslavia, 1948–60". Diplomatic History. 11 (1). Oxford University Press: 41–53. doi:10.1111/j.1467-7709.1987.tb00003.x. ISSN 0145-2096. JSTOR 24911740. Archived from the original on 30 November 2020.
- Carafano, James Jay (2002). Waltzing Into the Cold War: The Struggle for Occupied Austria. College Station, Texas: Texas A&M University Press. ISBN 9781585442133.
- Cohen, Lenard J.; Dragović-Soso, Jasna (2008). State Collapse in South-Eastern Europe: New Perspectives on Yugoslavia's Disintegration. Purdue University Press. ISBN 9781557534606.
- Curtis, Glenn E., ed. (1992). Yugoslavia: a country study (3rd ed.). Washington D.C.: Federal Research Division, Library of Congress. ISBN 0-8444-0735-6. OCLC 24792849. Archived from the original on 20 October 2021. This article incorporates text from this source, which is in the public domain.
- Dimitrijevic, Bojan (1997). "The mutual defense aid program in Tito's Yugoslavia, 1951–1958, and its technical impact". Journal of Slavic Military Studies. 10 (2): 19–33. doi:10.1080/13518049708430288.
- Jakovina, Tvrtko (2002). Socijalizam na američkoj pšenici: (1948–1963) [Socialism on American Wheat: (1948–1963)] (in Croatian). Zagreb, Croatia: Matica hrvatska. OCLC 237686413.
- Krivokapić, Radovan V. (1969). Bibliografija vojnih izdanja: 1945–1968 [Bibliography of Military Editions: 1945–1968] (in Serbo-Croatian). Belgrade: Vojnoizdavački zavod. Tirage: 1500.
- O'Shea, Brendan (2005). The Modern Yugoslav Conflict 1991–1995: Perception, Deception and Dishonesty. London: Routledge. ISBN 978-0-415-35705-0.
- Ramet, Sabrina P. (2006). The Three Yugoslavias: State-Building and Legitimation, 1918–2005. Bloomington: Indiana University Press. ISBN 978-0-253-34656-8.
- Razvoj Oruzanih Snaga SFRJ [The Development of the Armed Forces of the Socialistic Federative Republic of Yugoslavia], Vols.3-2, The Ground Forces (Belgrade 1987). "This is a classified edition marked with the military security label 'for internal use' published for the 40th Anniversary of the Yugoslav Army. The entire set includes 24 books covering all aspects of the Yugoslav Army, written with consultation of the still classified primary sources" [comment in endnotes of Dimitrijevic 1997].
- Tempest, Rone (23 January 1990). "Communists in Yugoslavia Split Into Factions". Los Angeles Times.
- Trifunovska, Snezana (1994). Yugoslavia Through Documents: From Its Creation to Its Dissolution. Martinus Nijhoff Publishers. ISBN 0-7923-2670-9.
- Woodward, Susan L. (1995). Socialist Unemployment: The Political Economy of Yugoslavia, 1945–1990. Princeton, New Jersey: Princeton University Press. ISBN 0-691-08645-1.
- Žabec, Krešimir (28 May 2011). "Tus, Stipetić, Špegelj i Agotić: Dan prije opsade Vukovara Tuđman je Imri Agotiću rekao: Rata neće biti!" [Tus, Stipetić, Špegelj and Agotić: A day ahead of the siege of Vukovar, Tuđman said to Imra Agotić: There will be no war!]. Jutarnji list (in Croatian). Archived from the original on 21 April 2012.
- Лексикон Народноослободилачког рата и револуције у Југославији 1941—1945 [Lexicon of the National Liberation War and the Revolution in Yugoslavia 1941—1945] (in Serbian). Beograd: Народна књига. 1980.
