= Sava-class submarine =

Yugoslav naval ship class (1978–2002)

Sava class
- Sava in 1998

Class overview
- Builders: Brodogradilište specijalnih objekata (BSO), Split, SR Croatia
- Operators: SFR Yugoslav Navy; FR Yugoslav Navy
- Preceded by: Heroj class
- Built: 1975–1981
- In commission: 1978–2002
- Completed: 2
- Retired: 2

General characteristics
- Type: Attack submarine
- Displacement: Surfaced: 770 t (760 long tons); Submerged: 964 t (949 long tons)
- Length: 55.9 m (183 ft 5 in)
- Propulsion: One shaft; diesel-electric; 2 × MTU diesel engines; 1 × Končar electric motor
- Speed: Surfaced: 10 knots (19 km/h; 12 mph); Submerged: 16.5 knots (30.6 km/h; 19.0 mph)
- Test depth: 300 m (984 ft 3 in)
- Complement: 35
- Armament: 6 × 533 mm (21.0 in) torpedo tubes for: 10 torpedoes or; 20 mines

The Sava class was a class of diesel-electric attack submarines built for the Yugoslav Navy during the late 1970s and early 1980s. Developed by the Brodarski Institute (BI) from Zagreb, the two strong class was built by the Brodogradilište specijalnih objekata (Special objects shipyard) in Split. They were intended as a replacement for the aging Sutjeska-class submarines. Compared to the earlier Heroj class, the Sava class was longer with more powerful armament that consisted of six torpedo tubes that could also be used for minelaying.

With the start of the Croatian War of Independence, both submarines were relocated to Boka Kotorska where they would be commissioned with the new FR Yugoslav Navy of, what would eventually become, Serbia and Montenegro. Both were decommissioned during the early 2000s.

== Development and building ==
The Sava class, named after the Sava River, was developed by the Brodarski Institute (BI) from Zagreb, SR Croatia as a replacement for the two Sutjeska-class boats in service. The project, designated B-72, was led by Colonel Dušan Radanović who was succeeded by Branko Ryšlavy. Compared to the previous Heroj-class attack submarines, the new class was to have a greater degree of automation with improved armament and autonomy including greater diving depths.

Both submarines, Sava (P-831) and Drava (P-832), were built by the Brodogradilište specijalnih objekata (Special objects shipyard) in Split, SR Croatia and named after rivers in SFR Yugoslavia. Sava was laid down in 1975, launched in 1977 and was commissioned in 1978. It was the second submarine in the Yugoslav Navy to carry that name, the first one being Sava (P-802). Drava was laid down in 1978, launched in 1981 and commissioned in 1982.

== Description ==
The submarines measured 55.9 m (183 ft 5 in) in length displacing 770 t (760 long tons) surfaced and 964 t (949 long tons) when submerged. The diesel-electric drive consisted of two MTU diesel engines and a Končar 1 MW (1,300 hp) electric motor mounted on a single shaft, enabling the boats a speed of 10 knots (19 km/h; 12 mph) when surfaced and a maximum speed of 16.5 knots (30.6 km/h; 19.0 mph) underwater. The boat's maximum diving depth was 300 m (984 ft 3 in) and were manned by a crew of 35.

Armament consisted of six 533 mm (21.0 in) forward facing torpedo tubes used for launching a complement of up to ten TEST-71ME torpedoes with a maximum range of 10.8 nmi (20 km; 12 mi) or up to twenty naval mines if used for minelaying operations. Sensors include a "Stop Light" radar warning system and a "Snoop Group" surface search radar. Sources are somewhat conflicting regarding installed sonar equipment.

== Service and aftermath ==
Both Sava and Drava were part of the 88th Submarine Flotilla of the Yugoslav Navy, with the Lora Naval Base in Split being their homeport. In October 1983 while underwater Drava suffered a hull breach which almost resulted in the submarine and its entire crew being lost. It was revealed that the cause of the breach was a design flaw in the submarine itself. With the start of the Croatian War of Independence both submarines were relocated to Montenegro where they were eventually commissioned with the FR Yugoslav Navy. The major overhaul of Drava was stopped in 1996 and the boat was decommissioned sometime around 1999. Sava was decommissioned in 2002 and was officially declared redundant in 2004, being not operational for some time by that point. The submarines were passed on to Montenegro after the country declared independence in 2006, and after unsuccessful attempts at selling the submarines as complete warships, in 2008 it was decided that they were to be sold for scrap or as museum exhibits.

Drava was sold and scrapped in June 2008 in Tivat. On 8 May 2008 Sava was sold as scrap for 174,500 Euros to the Podgorica firm "Mont Metal" and was towed to Turkey for scrapping. An article published in 2010 suggested that the submarine was sold along with the "Orca-2000" system still on board, although it was supposed to be removed along with the other sensitive combat equipment. "Orca-2000" was a torpedo fire control system that could also be used for navigation and was developed in Serbia and Montenegro . A few days later Rajko Bulatović, commander of the Montenegrin Navy at the time, made a statement explaining the "Orca-2000" system was never installed on Sava, and was in fact, developed for a foreign customer.

== See also ==
Equivalent submarines of the same era

- Näcken class
- Sauro class
- Type 209
- Agosta class
