= Yugoslav Navy =

Naval warfare branch of former state of Yugoslavia

- Југословенска ратна морнарица Jugoslavenska ratna mornarica
- Emblem of the Yugoslav Navy
- Founded: 10 September 1942
- Disbanded: 27 April 1992
- Country: Yugoslavia
- Type: Navy
- Role: Coastal defence
- Size: 11,000 personnel 90 vessels
- Part of: Yugoslav People's Army
- H/Q: Lora naval base, Split, SR Croatia (1945–1991); Kotor, SR Montenegro (1991–1992)
- March: "More i mornari" ("Sea and Sailors")
- Anniversaries: 10 September
- Engagements: World War II; Croatian War of Independence; Battle of Zadar; Battle of the Dalmatian channels; Battle of Šibenik; Siege of Dubrovnik; Battle of Vukovar
- Decorations: See article

Commanders
- Commander of the Navy: See list
- Last commander: Miodrag Jokić

Insignia
- Ensign (1949–1992)

- Jack (1963–1992)

The Yugoslav Navy (Serbo-Croatian: Југословенска ратна морнарица, Jugoslavenska ratna mornarica, lit. 'Yugoslav War Navy'), was the navy of Yugoslavia from 1942 to 1992. It was essentially a coastal defense force with the mission of preventing enemy landings along Yugoslavia's rugged 4,000-kilometer shoreline or coastal islands, and contesting an enemy blockade or control of the strategic Strait of Otranto.

In 1990, it had 10,000 sailors (including 4,400 conscripts), including 2,300 in 25 coastal artillery batteries and 900 marines in one light naval infantry brigade. Following the breakup of Yugoslavia, the navy's equipment and watercraft were claimed by the emergent Croatian Navy, Montenegrin Navy, Serbian River Flotilla, and Slovenian Navy.

== History ==
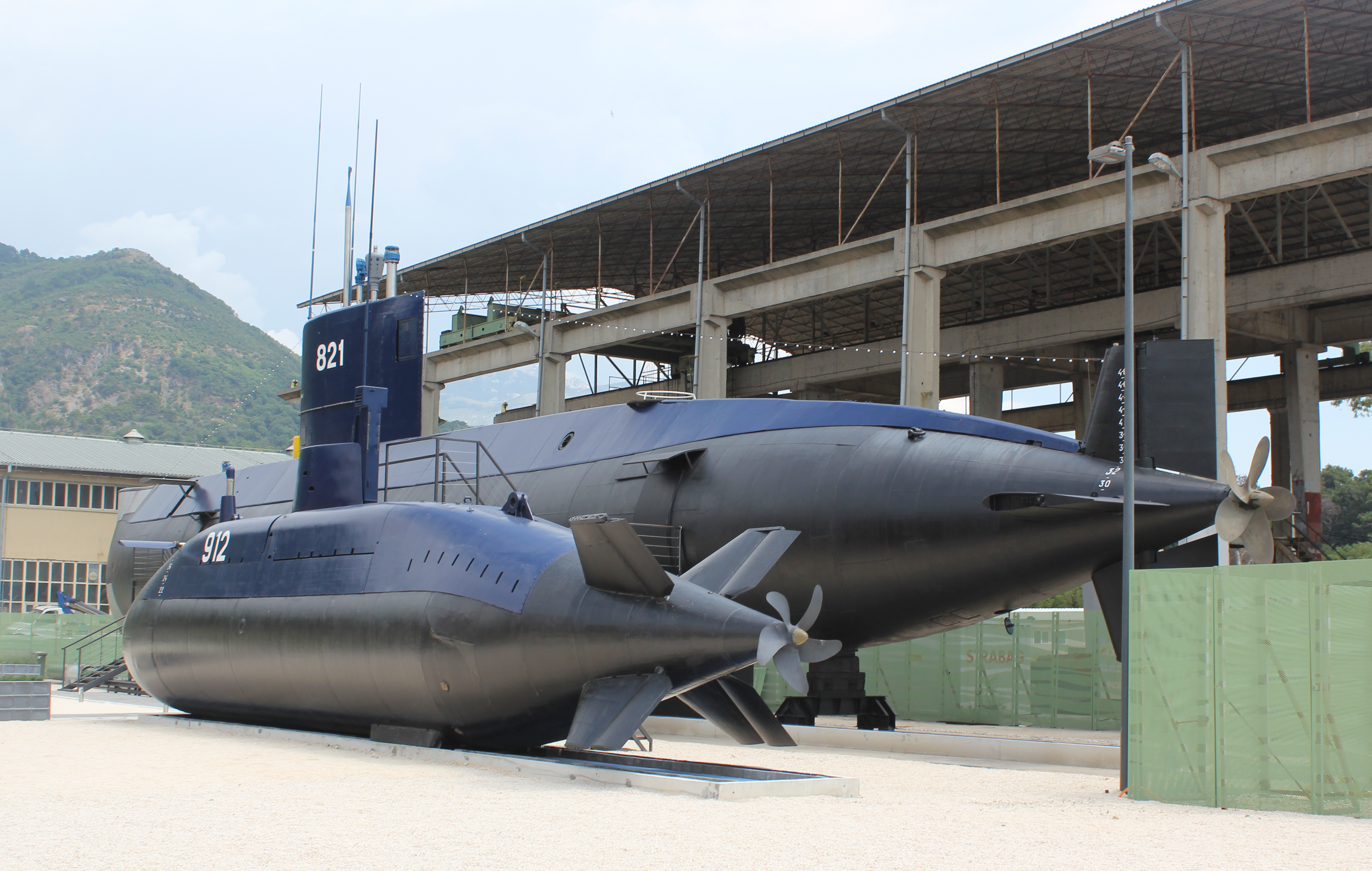
Former Yugoslav Navy submarines Heroj (P-821) and Una (P-912) in the Museum of Maritime Affairs in the port of Porto Montenegro, Tivat.

The Partisans had operated many small boats in raids harassing Italian convoys in the Adriatic Sea during World War II.

The founding day of the Yugoslav Navy was considered the day when a naval platoon was separated from the Partisan battalion "Vid Mihaljević" in Podgora, Dalmatia, on 10 September 1942. After the Supreme Headquarters of the People's Liberation Army of Yugoslavia ordered the headquarters of the 4th Operational Zone of Croatia to establish a Naval Section, on 18 December 1942, the first "naval station" was established in Podgora at the end of December, and on 23 January 1943 the First Naval Detachment with stations in Podgora and Igrane. Due to the worsening war situation, it was unable to establish itself more firmly, but operations continued throughout Dalmatia.

After the war, the navy operated numerous German and Italian submarines, destroyers, minesweepers, and tank-landing craft captured during the war or received as war reparations. The United States provided eight torpedo boats in the late 1940s, but most of those units were soon obsolete. Two ex-Royal Navy W-class destroyers were bought in 1956.

The navy was upgraded in the 1960s when it acquired ten Osa-I class missile boats and four Shershen-class torpedo boats from the Soviet Union. The Soviets granted a license to build eleven additional Shershen units in Yugoslav shipyards developed for this purpose.

In 1980 and 1982, the navy took delivery of two Soviet Koni-class frigates. In 1988 it completed two additional units under license. The Koni frigates were armed with four Soviet SS-N-2B surface-to-surface missile launchers, twin SA-N-4 surface-to-air missiles, and antisubmarine rocket launchers. The Yugoslav navy developed its own submarine-building capability during the 1960s. In 1990, the main combat units of the submarine service were three Heroj class patrol submarines armed with 533 mm torpedoes. Two smaller Sava class units entered service in the late 1970s. Two Sutjeska class submarines had been relegated mainly to training missions by 1990. At that time, the navy had apparently shifted to construction of versatile midget submarines. Four Una-class midget submarines and four Mala-class swimmer delivery vehicles were in service in the late 1980s. They were built for use by underwater demolition teams and special forces. The Una-class boats carried five crewmen, eight combat swimmers, four Mala vehicles, and limpet mines. The Mala vehicles in turn carried two swimmers and 250 kilograms of mines.

The navy operated ten Osa I-class and six Rade Končar-class missile boats. The Osa I boats were armed with four SS-N-2A surface-to-surface missile launchers. In 1990, domestic Kobra boats were scheduled to begin replacing the Osa I boats. The Kobra was to be armed with four SS-N-2C launchers or eight Swedish RBS-15 antiship missile launchers. Armed with two SS-N-2B launchers, the Končar-class boats were modeled after the Swedish Spica class. The navy also operated fifteen Shershen-class torpedo boats and eleven Yugoslav-built units.

Patrol boats were operated primarily for antisubmarine warfare. The inventory included three Mornar-class corvettes with antisubmarine rocket launchers and depth charges. The Mornar class was based on a French design from the mid-1950s. Seventeen Mirna inshore patrol boats and thirteen older Kraljevica submarine chasers also were available.

The navy's mine warfare and countermeasures capabilities were considered adequate in 1990. It operated four Vukov Klanac class coastal minehunters built on a French design, four British Ham-class inshore minesweepers, and six 117-class inshore minesweepers built in domestic shipyards. Larger numbers of older and less capable minesweepers were mainly used in riverine operations. Other older units were used as dedicated minelayers. The navy used amphibious landing craft in support of army operations in the area of the Danube, Sava, and Drava rivers. They included both tank and assault landing craft. In 1990, there were four 501-class, ten 211-class, and twenty-five 601-class landing craft in service. Most of them were also capable of laying mines in rivers and coastal areas.

The coastal artillery batteries had both surface-to-surface missiles and guns. They operated the Soviet-designed SS-C-3 and a truck-mounted, Yugoslav-produced Brom antiship missile. The latter was essentially a Yugoslav variant of the Soviet SS-N-2. Coastal guns included over 400 88 mm, 122 mm, 130 mm, and 152 mm artillery pieces obtained from the Soviet Union, the United States, postwar Germany, and Yugoslav manufacturers.

In November 1991 during the Croatian War of Independence, there was a three-day confrontation between three tactical groups of Yugoslav Navy ships and coastal artillery, and a detachment of naval commandos of the Croatian Navy.

== Organisation ==
=== Navy ===
Minor surface combatants operated by the navy included about 80 frigates, corvettes, submarines, minesweepers, and missile, torpedo, and patrol boats in the Adriatic Fleet. The entire coast of Yugoslavia was part of the naval region headquartered at Split. The naval region was divided into three smaller naval districts and the Danube Flotilla with major bases located at Split, Šibenik, Pula, Ploče, and Kotor on the Adriatic and Novi Sad on the Danube. The fleet was organized into missile, torpedo, and patrol boat brigades, a submarine division, and minesweeper flotillas. The naval order of battle included four frigates, three corvettes, five patrol submarines, 58 missile, torpedo, and patrol boats, and 28 minesweepers. Navy had a support of one antisubmarine warfare helicopter squadron based at Divulje on the Adriatic for coastal operations. It employed Soviet Ka-25, Ka-28 and Mi-14 helicopters, and domestic Partisan helicopters. Some air force fighter and reconnaissance squadrons supported naval operations.

After the collapse of the State Union of Serbia and Montenegro (the final dissolution of Yugoslavia), the 108-th missile brigade for coastal defense, the 88-th fleet of submarines, the hydrographic Institute of the navy in Lepetani and the naval testing center were disbanded in 2007. Seven missile systems Frontier-E from the 108-th missile brigade and five missile boats class Osa were sold to Egypt, property of the naval testing center were transferred in the technical testing center of the Serbian army, naval base in Tivat Arsenal was sold to Canadian businessman Peter Munk for 3.2 million euro.

=== Marines ===
The 12th Naval Infantry Brigade (Mornarička Pešadijska Brigada) were the marines of the Yugoslav Navy until 4 February 2003 when it became part the Navy of the State Union of Serbia and Montenegro. The 12th Naval Infantry Brigade was headquartered in the 8th Naval Sector at Split but was later moved near Kotor, a coastal town in Montenegro. A small detachment was located at Novi Sad on the Danube. The brigade consisted of 900 to 2,000 men in two or three battalions. As a multi-ethnic unit, the brigade was broken up during the Breakup of Yugoslavia, and it saw little action. The largest remnant eventually moved to Montenegro. There is a naval special forces detachment (Pomorski odred - Specijalne snage) In the Montenegrin Navy — perhaps this is composed of residual members of the 12th Naval Infantry Brigade.

== Equipment ==
=== Sea Fleet ===
Frigates:

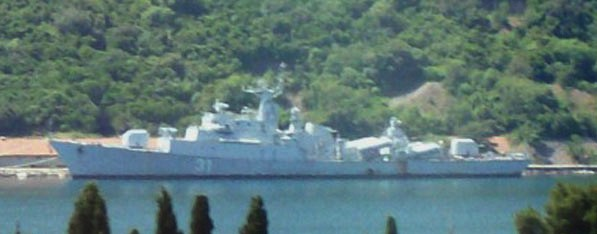
Koni-class frigate Split VPBR 31

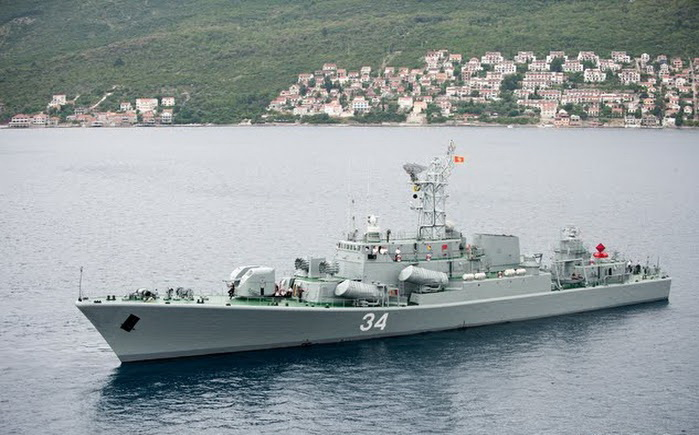
Frigate Kotor class Pula VPBR 34

- Koni class Soviet Union
  - RF-31 Split (since 1993 Beograd) – Withdrawn from operational use by VCSG, scrapped in August 2013.
  - RF-32 Koper (since 1993 Podgorica) – Withdrawn from operational use by the Yugoslav Navy (RMVJ) in 1995. Partially cannibalized for parts in 2007 and sold to Yugoimport SDPR for further cannibalization, finally scrapped in 2008 at Tivat Arsenal.
- Kotor class Yugoslavia
  - RF-33 Kotor – Remained in operational use by Navy of Serbia and Montenegro and after its dissolution by Montenegrin Navy. Withdrawn from service in 2019, to be sold. Montenegro
  - RF-34 Pula – Remained in operational use by Navy of Serbia and Montenegro and after its dissolution by Montenegrin Navy. Withdrawn from service in 2019, to be sold. Montenegro

Submarines:

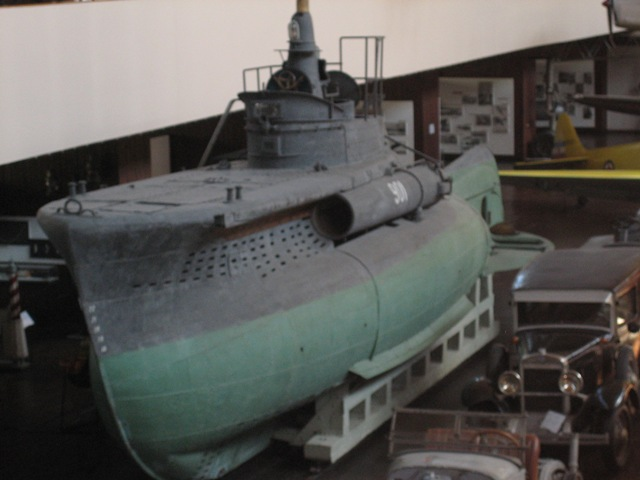
Mališan on display at Zagreb

- P-801 Tara - Formerly called Nebojša, the only Yugoslav Royal Navy submarine that survived the 1941 German invasion. Withdrawn from service in 1954. United Kingdom
- P-802 Sava - Withdrawn from service in 1968. United Kingdom
- P-901 Mališan - Former Italian midget submarine CB-20. Withdrawn from service in 1959. Italy
- Sutjeska class Yugoslavia
  - P-811 Sutjeska - Withdrawn from service in 1980.
  - P-812 Neretva - Withdrawn from service in 1981.
- Heroj class Yugoslavia
  - P-821 Heroj – Heavy maintenance stopped during 2004, withdrawn from operational use. On display at the Naval Museum in Tivat.
  - P-822 Junak – Withdrawn from operational use by the RMVJ mid-90s. Scrapped for reclaimed iron at Tivat Arsenal.
  - P-823 Uskok – Withdrawn from operational use by the RMVJ in 1998. Sold and scrapped for reclaimed iron to Izmir, Turkey, in 2007.
- Sava class Yugoslavia
  - P-831 Sava – Withdrawn from operational use by VSCG in 2004. Towed to Turkey in March 2010, where she was cut up for scrap.
  - P-832 Drava – Heavy maintenance stopped during 1996, withdrawn from operational use by the VSCG. Cut up for scrap metal at Tivat Arsenal in June 2008.
- Una class Yugoslavia
  - P-911Tisa – Withdrawn from operational use by the RMVJ in 1997. To go on display in Belgrade
  - P-912 Una – Withdrawn from operational use by the RMVJ in 1997. On display at the Naval Museum in Tivat.
  - P-913 Zeta – On display at the Pivka Military History Park in Pivka, Slovenia since 2011
  - P-914 Soča – Remained in Croatia during events of 1991. Modernization completed in 1996. In operational use by the Croatian Navy as Velebit (P-01) until 2004, when she was withdrawn. Currently awaiting sale at Lora Naval Base in Split, Croatia.
  - P-915 Vardar – Heavy maintenance stopped in 2003, withdrawn from operational use by the MVSCG. Scrapped in July 2008 at Tivat Arsenal.
  - P-916 Vrbas – Withdrawn from operational use by MVSCG in 2005. To go on display in Kumbor, Herceg-Novi.

Guided Missile Gunboats:

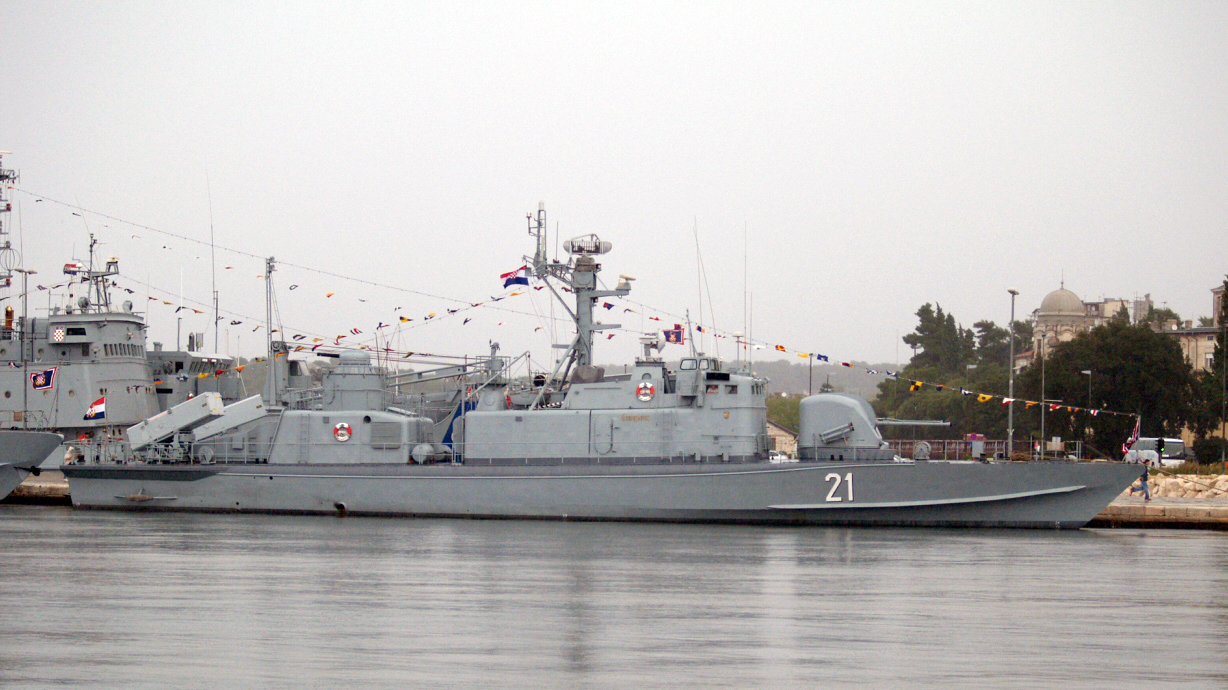
Končar class RTOP-21 Šibenik

- Končar class Yugoslavia
  - RTOP-401 Rade Končar – Withdrawn from operational use by the MCG in 2006. Currently awaiting sale at Bar, Montenegro.
  - RTOP-402 Vlado Ćetković – Captured by the Croatian Navy at Šibenik in September 1991. Introduced into operational use as RTOP-21 Šibenik. Located at Lora Naval Base in Split.
  - RTOP-403 Ramiz Sadiku – Heavy maintenance stopped mid-1990s. Withdrawn from operational use by the RMVJ in 2007, scrapped in 2014.
  - RTOP-404 Hasan Zahirović-Laca – Withdrawn from operational use by the MCG in 2006. Currently awaiting sale at Bar, Montenegro.
  - RTOP-405 Jordan Nikolov – Orce – Overhauled and in storage by the MCG.
  - RTOP-406 Ante Banina – Overhauled and in storage by the MCG.

Fast Missile Boats:

- Osa class Soviet Union
  - RČ-301 Mitar Acev– Captured by the Croatian Navy at Šibenik in 1991. In operational use by the Croatian Navy as the fast patrol boat-minelayer OBM-41 Dubrovnik until 2008.
  - RČ-302 Vlado Bagat – Withdrawn from operational use by the RMVJ in the mid-1990s. Fate unknown.
  - RČ-303 Petar Drapšin - Withdrawn from operational use by the RMVJ in the mid-1990s. Fate unknown.
  - RČ-304 Stjepan Filipović-Stevo – Withdrawn from operational use by the RMVJ in the mid-1990s. Modernised at Tivat Arsenal in Montenegro. In operational use by Egyptian Navy since 2007, serial 647.
  - RČ-305 Žikica Jovanović-Španac - Withdrawn from operational use by the RMVJ in the mid-1990s. Modernised at Tivat Arsenal in Montenegro. In operational use by Egyptian Navy since 2007, serial 649.
  - RČ-306 Nikola Martinović - Withdrawn from operational use by the RMVJ in the mid-1990s. Modernised at Tivat Arsenal in Montenegro. In operational use by Egyptian Navy since 2007, serial 651.
  - RČ-307 Josip Mažar –Šoša - Withdrawn from operational use by the RMVJ in the mid-1990s. Modernised at Tivat Arsenal in Montenegro. In operational use by Egyptian Navy since 2007, serial 653.
  - RČ-308 Karlo Rojc - Withdrawn from operational use by the RMVJ in the mid-1990s. Modernised at Tivat Arsenal in Montenegro. In operational use by the Egyptian Navy since 2007, serial 655.
  - RČ-309 Franc Rozman-Stane - Withdrawn from operational use by the RMVJ in the mid-1990s. Fate unknown.
  - RČ-310 Velimir Škorpik – Captured in September 1991 at Šibenik by the Croatian Navy and sunk on 12 October 1994 in a live ammunition target practice by the missile boats Kralj Petar Krešimir IV and OBM-41 Dubrovnik during operation Posejdon.

Torpedo boats:

- Shershen class Soviet Union/Yugoslavia
  - TČ-211 Pionir
  - TČ-212 Partizan
  - TČ-213 Proleter
  - TČ-214 Topčider
  - TČ-215 Ivan
  - TČ-216 Jadran
  - TČ-217 Kornat
  - TČ-218 Biokovac
  - TČ-219 Streljko - Captured by the Croatian Navy in September 1991 at Šibenik . Heavily damaged, she never returned to service and was sunk as a target by the missile boats Kralj Petar Krešimir IV and OBM-41 Dubrovnik on 12 October 1994, during operation Posejdon.
  - TČ-220 Crvena zvezda
  - TČ-221 Partizan III - Captured in September 1991 at Šibenik by the Croatian Navy, with which she saw service as OBM-51 Vukovar.
  - TČ-222 Partizan II
  - TČ-223 Napredak
  - TČ-224 Pionir II

Patrol boats:

- C-80 class Yugoslavia
  - PČ-132 Kalnik
  - PČ-133 Velebit
  - PČ-134 Romanija
  - PČ-135 Triglav
  - PČ-136 Lovćen
- Mirna class Yugoslavia
  - PČ-171 Biokovo - Damaged off Škarda island by a 9K11 Malyutka missile fired by Croatian naval personnel landed from the armed fishing boats Maša and Nirvana, anchored at a cove in the island on 10 November 1991; limped to Mali Lošinj. Later captured by the Croatian Navy. In operational use as OB-01 Novigrad. Located at Lora Naval Base in Split.
  - PČ-172 Pohorje - In Montenegro, used for tourists.
  - PČ-173 Koprivnik - Shelled Šibenik on 17 September 1991, during the Serb assault on the city. In Montenegro, used for tourists.
  - PČ-174 Učka - In service with Montenegro police
  - PČ-175 Grmeč - Evacuated to Montenegro during 1991. Sold to a private owner from Croatia in 2007.
  - PČ-176 Mukos - Heavily damaged on 14 November 1991 off Šolta island by a torpedo launched by Croatian Navy special forces during the Battle of the Dalmatian channels. Abandoned by the JRM and towed by local civilian boats, she was later raised, repaired and put back in operational use by HRM as OB-02 Šolta.
  - PČ-177 Fruška Gora - In Montenegro, used for tourists.
  - PČ-178 Kosmaj - In service with Montenegro police
  - PČ-179 Zelengora - Evacuated to Montenegro during 1991. In 2007, she was sold to a private owner from Croatia.
  - PČ-180 Cer - Shelled Šibenik on 17 September 1991, during the Serb assault on the city. Captured by the Croatian Navy at that port days later. In operational use as OB-03 Cavtat. Located at Lora Naval Base in Split, Croatia.
  - PČ-181 Durmitor - Captured by the Croatian Navy at Šibenik in 1991. In operational use as OB-04 Hrvatska Kostajnica. Located at Lora Naval Base in Split, Croatia.

School ship:

- Galeb Italy / Yugoslavia - Former presidential yacht. Transferred to municipality of Rijeka in 2009 for restoration as museum ship.
- Jadran Germany - Currently in operational use by Montenegro.

=== River Fleet ===
Command ship

- RPB-30 Kozara Austria

Station for degauss

- 36 Šabac Yugoslavia

River minesweepers

- Neštin class Yugoslavia
  - RML-331 Neštin - In service with the River Flotilla of the Serbian Armed Forces.
  - RML-332 Motajica - In service with the River Flotilla of the Serbian Armed Forces.
  - RML-333 Belegiš - sold to a tourist agency.
  - RML-334 Bosut - Withdrawn and cannibalised.
  - RML-335 Vučedol - In service with the River Flotilla of the Serbian Armed Forces.
  - RML-336 Djerdap - In service with the River Flotilla of the Serbian Armed Forces.
- Botica class
  - RML-307
  - RML-308 - Damaged in combat in the Danube on 8 November 1991 while attempting to stop Czechoslovak towboat Šariš, suspected of smuggling arms to Croatia.
  - RML-309
  - RML-310

River patrol boats

- 21 class Yugoslavia
  - ČMP-21
  - ČMP-22
  - ČMP-23
  - ČMP-24
- 25 class Yugoslavia
  - ČMP-25
  - ČMP-26
  - ČMP-27
- 302 class Yugoslavia
  - PČ-302
  - PČ-303

Assault boats

- 101 class Yugoslavia
  - DČ-101 Yugoslavia
  - DČ-102

== See also ==
- Royal Yugoslav Navy
- Croatian Navy
- Navy of the Independent State of Croatia
- Slovenian Navy
- Serbian River Flotilla
- Military of Serbia and Montenegro
