= R-2 Mala-class swimmer delivery vehicle =

Underwater diver propulsion equipment

R-2 Mala-class
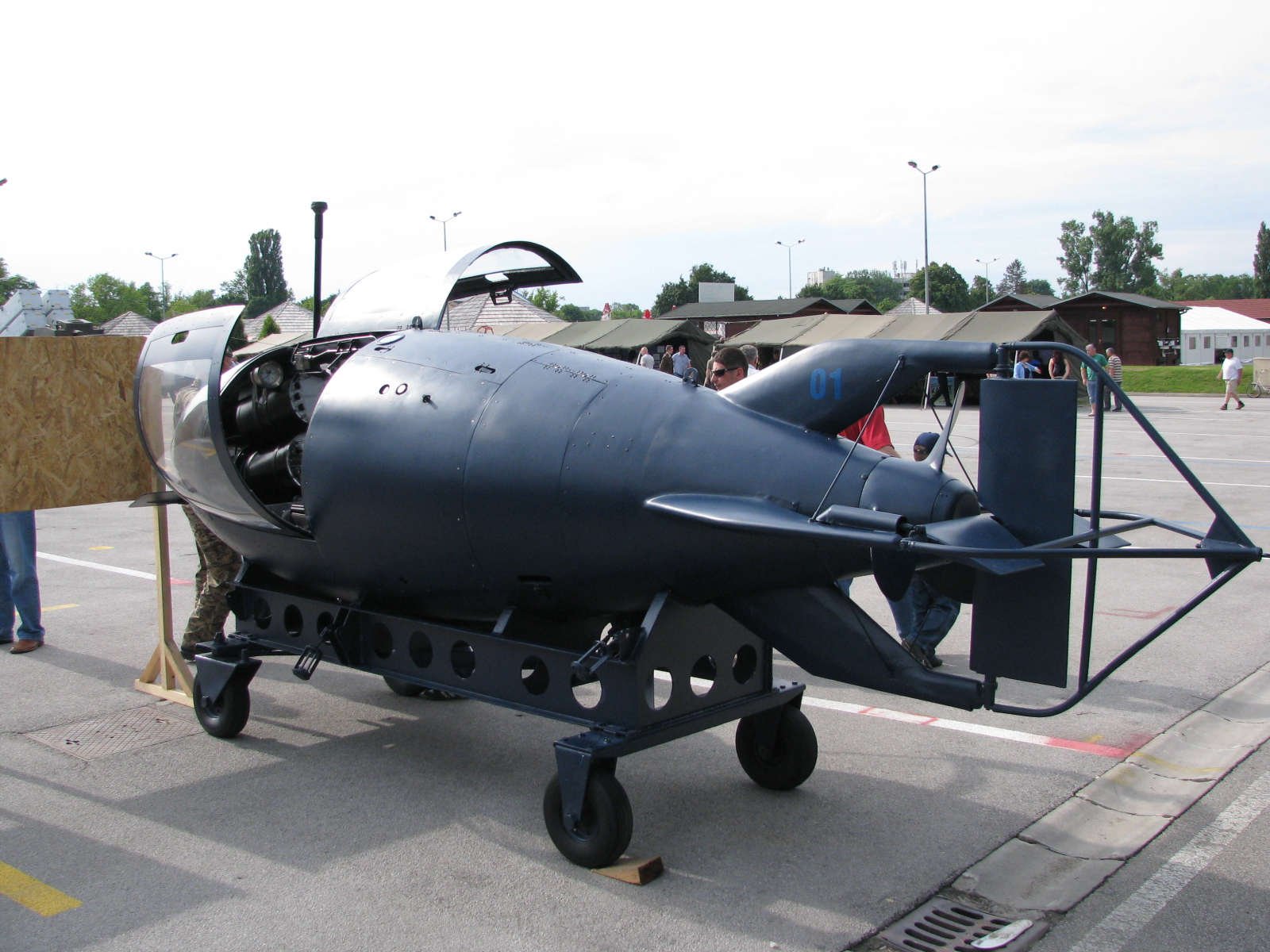
- A Croatian R-2M Mala photographed in 2010.

Class overview
- Builders: Brodogradilište specijalnih objekata (BSO), Split, Croatia
- Operators: SFR Yugoslav Navy
- Preceded by: R-1-class

General characteristics
- Displacement: Empty: 1,400 kg (3,100 lb)
- Length: 4.8 m (15 ft 9 in)
- Beam: 1.4 m (4 ft 7 in)
- Propulsion: One shaft; 1 × electric engine
- Speed: Maximum: 4.4 knots (8.1 km/h; 5.1 mph)
- Test depth: Working depth: 15–60 m (49 ft 3 in – 196 ft 10 in) Maximum depth: 100 m (328 ft 1 in)
- Complement: 2
- Armament: 2 × 50 kg (110 lb) limpet mines

The R-2 Mala is a class of swimmer delivery vehicles (SDVs) built for the Yugoslav, and later on, Croatian Navy. The two man wet SDVs are used for transporting naval commandos into hostile waters where they would perform sabotage on enemy warships and coastal installations. Weapons at their disposal included limpet mines.

With the start of the Croatian War of Independence SDVs in service with the Yugoslav Navy were relocated to FR Yugoslavia. Two new vehicles were completed for the Croatian Navy during the 1990s while a small number these vehicles were also exported to Syria and Sweden before the war.

== Description ==
Developed by the Brodarski institut (BI) from Zagreb, the R-2 Mala swimmer delivery vehicles were designed for transporting naval special forces armed with two 50 kg (110 lb) limpet mines inside enemy-controlled waters. After reaching their area of operations, the divers would anchor the vehicle and continue on their own by swimming until they reached their targets which included warships in port or other coastal installations.

The SDVs were constructed from aluminium and plexiglass, utilizing an enclosed wet crew compartment. Propulsion consisted of a single 3.5–4.5 kW (4.7–6.0 hp) electric engine mounted on a single shaft, enabling them a maximum speed of 4.4 knots (8.1 km/h; 5.1 mph) and a cruising speed of 3.7 knots (6.9 km/h; 4.3 mph). Moving at their maximum speed they have a range of 18 nmi (33 km; 21 mi) increasing to 23 nmi (43 km; 26 mi) if travelling at their cruise speed.

Normal operating depth is between 15–60 m (49 ft 3 in – 196 ft 10 in) while the maximum test depth is 100 m (328 ft 1 in). Without the divers and their armament the vehicles displace 1,400 kg (3,100 lb).

== Service ==
Although the exact date of when production started is unknown, it appears that a total of 18 SDVs were produced, the last ones being built in 1994 for the Croatian Navy. In service with the Yugoslav Navy (JRM) the Malas were operated by the naval special forces of 82nd Naval Center. An unknown number of vehicles were exported to Sweden and possibly Syria. With the start of the Croatian War of Independence the majority of Yugoslav Navy's inventory was relocated to Montenegro, including the R-2 Malas. Although Conways's All of the World's Fighting Ships 1947-1995 reported that two vehicles were captured by Croatia in 1992, it is possible that the two SDVs still in use by Croatia are in fact new ones that were built in 1994 after the start of the war.

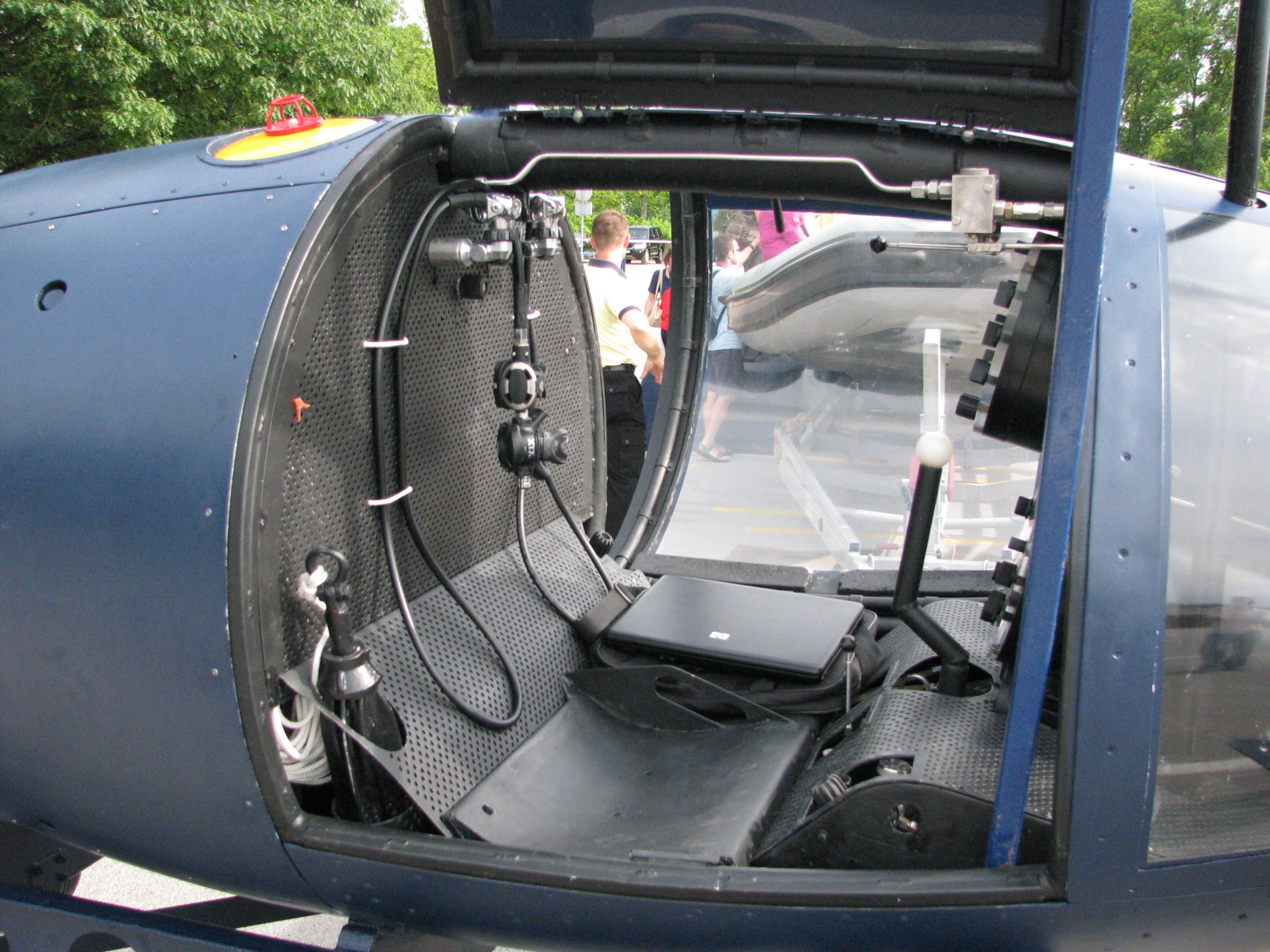
Interior of a Croatian R-2M Mala photographed in 2010

Vehicles in service with Serbia and Montenegro were later passed on to Montenegro when the country declared independence in 2006. In 2009 a single R-1 and R-2 Mala were donated to the Porto Montenegro museum in Tivat. A document from 2011 revealed that the Armed Forces of Montenegro possessed twelve R-1s and four R-2 Malas, all of which were nonoperational due to the expired lifetime of their batteries and were declared redundant. Again, one of each vehicles were donated by the Montenegrin government to the Association of professional divers of Montenegro for use in their diving museum.

An article from 2010 revealed that the Armed Forces of Croatia operated two vehicles assigned to the Special Operations Battalion's 3rd Company that specialises in amphibious warfare. The vehicles are designated R-2M and were modernised sometime during 2009 improving their range and digitalizing the navigation system. Before that the vehicles were out of service for seven years.

== See also ==
- The Una-class, a class of Yugoslav midget submarines used for covert operations.
