= Croatian patrol boat Šolta =

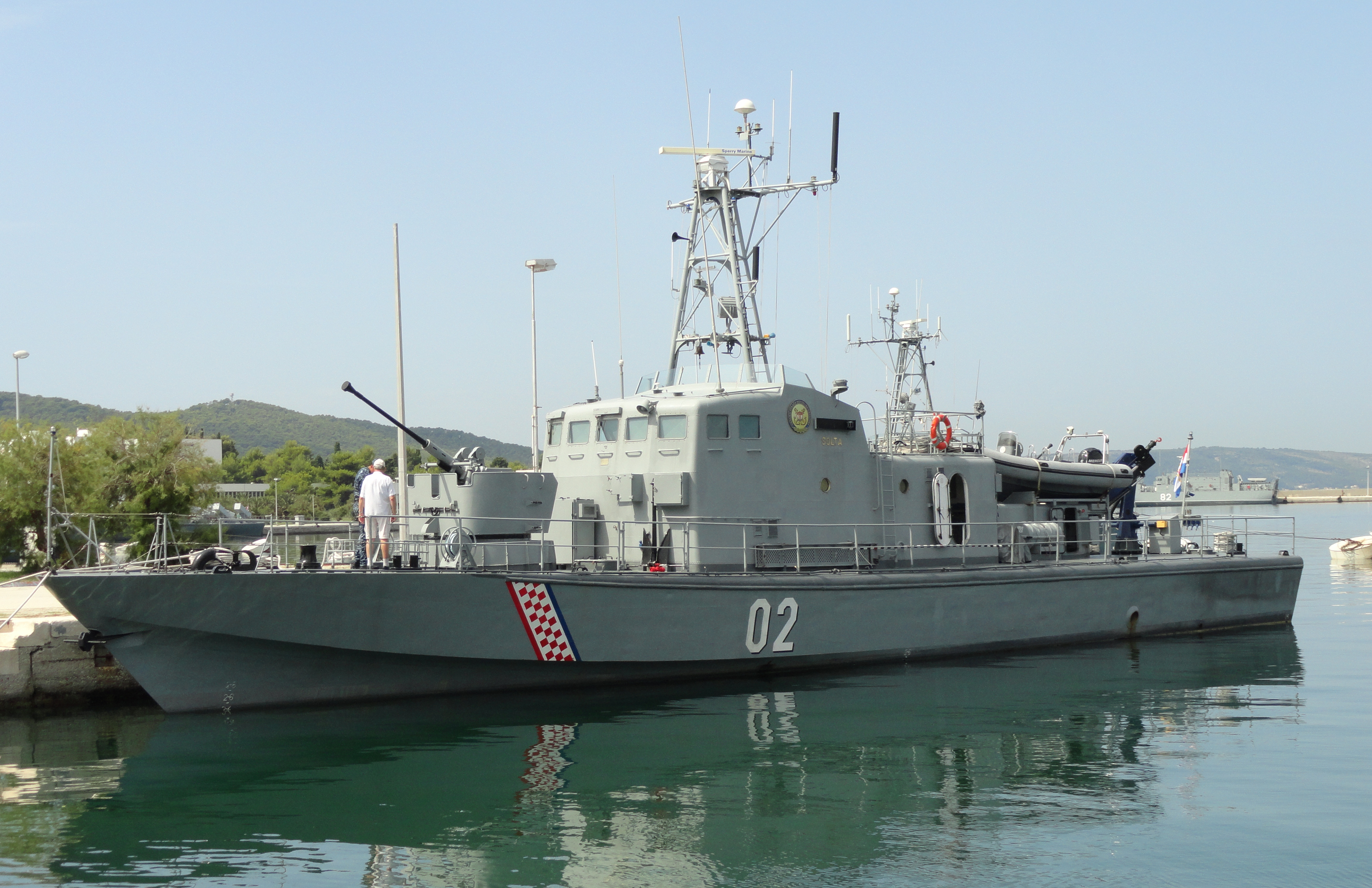
- Šolta in the Lora Naval base in August 2011.

History

Yugoslavia
- Name: Mukos
- Builder: Tito's Shipyard Kraljevica, Kraljevica, SR Croatia
- Launched: 18 November 1982
- Out of service: 14 November 1991
- Identification: PČ-176

Croatia
- Name: Šolta
- Namesake: Šolta (island)
- Operator: Croatian Navy
- Commissioned: 15 May 1992
- Identification: Pennant number: OB-02; MMSI number: 238320040; Callsign: 9AA3733
- Status: Active

General characteristics
- Class & type: Mirna-class patrol boat
- Displacement: Standard: 125 t (123 long tons); Full: 142 t (140 long tons)
- Length: 32 m (105 ft 0 in)
- Beam: 6.75 m (22 ft 2 in)
- Draught: 2.7 m (8 ft 10 in)
- Propulsion: Two shafts; 2 × SEMT Pielstick diesel engines
- Speed: Maximum: 30 knots (56 km/h; 35 mph)
- Armament: 1 × Bofors 40 mm (1.6 in)/1 D70 gun

Šolta (pennant number OB-02) is a Mirna-class patrol boat in service with the Croatian Navy. Completed during the 1980s as Mukos (PČ-176), it was the sixth ship of a class that was being built for the Yugoslav Navy in the Kraljevica Shipyard.

During the Croatian War of Independence, Mukos was part of a tactical group tasked with enforcing a naval blockade of the city of Split. On 14 November 1991, Croatian Navy commandos disabled the vessel with an improvised torpedo, leaving the vessel drifting and abandoned by her crew. The crippled ship was then tugged away by Croatian locals to the nearby island of Šolta. She was subsequently repaired and entered service with the Croatian Navy as Šolta. As of 2014, Šolta remains in service with the Croatian Coast Guard, an integral part of the navy.

== Design and construction ==
Šolta was laid down as Mukos (PČ-176) in the Kraljevica Shipyard as the sixth ship in a class of patrol boats that were being built for the Yugoslav Navy (JRM). It was launched on 18 November 1982. She measures 32 m (105 ft) in length, has a draught of 2.7 m (8.9 ft), a 6.75 m (22.1 ft) beam and a standard displacement of 125 tonnes (123 long tons) or 142 tonnes (140 long tons) when full.

Powered by two SEMT Pielstick 12PA4 200VGDS diesel engines that spin two propellers, Šolta has a maximum speed of 29.5–30 knots (54.6–55.6 km/h; 33.9–34.5 mph) and a continuous speed of 28 knots (52 km/h; 32 mph). She has a range of 600 nautical miles (1,100 km; 690 mi) at 15 knots (28 km/h; 17 mph) and an autonomy of four to five days that can be extended to eight days during wartime.

The ship's original armament consisted of a single Bofors 40 mm D70 gun mounted on the ship's bow, a quadruple Strela 2 launcher behind the bridge and a quad 20 mm M-75 gun on the stern. Eight MDB-MT3 depth charges could be carried for anti-submarine warfare duties. Located on the sides were two double-barrel 128 mm illumination launchers. Sensors included a Racal Decca RM 1216 A surface search radar and a Simrad SQ 3D/SF sonar.

== Service ==
During its service in the Yugoslav Navy, Mukos was part of the border patrol detachment. In November 1991, during the Croatian War of Independence, Mukos was part of the "Kaštela" tactical group that was tasked with enforcing a naval blockade of the port of Split and the surrounding islands. On 14 November, at around 17:30, while on patrol in the Split strait between the islands of Brač and Šolta, Mukos was hit with an improvised torpedo launched by special forces of the Croatian Navy (HRM), effectively starting the Battle of the Dalmatian Channels. The HRM command constructed the torpedo from a small outboard motor boat loaded with explosives. A former missile technician from the Yugoslavian Navy had, while receiving training on Saab missiles in Sweden, picked up some remote control plane parts in a hobby store. Handed over to HRM, the gear yielded the ability to remotely control the unmanned vessel. The explosion ripped a hole in the forward section of the hull, causing the bow to flood and killing three crew members. The remaining crew was rescued by a Shershen-class torpedo boat Pionir II (TČ-224) while Mukos itself was left adrift.

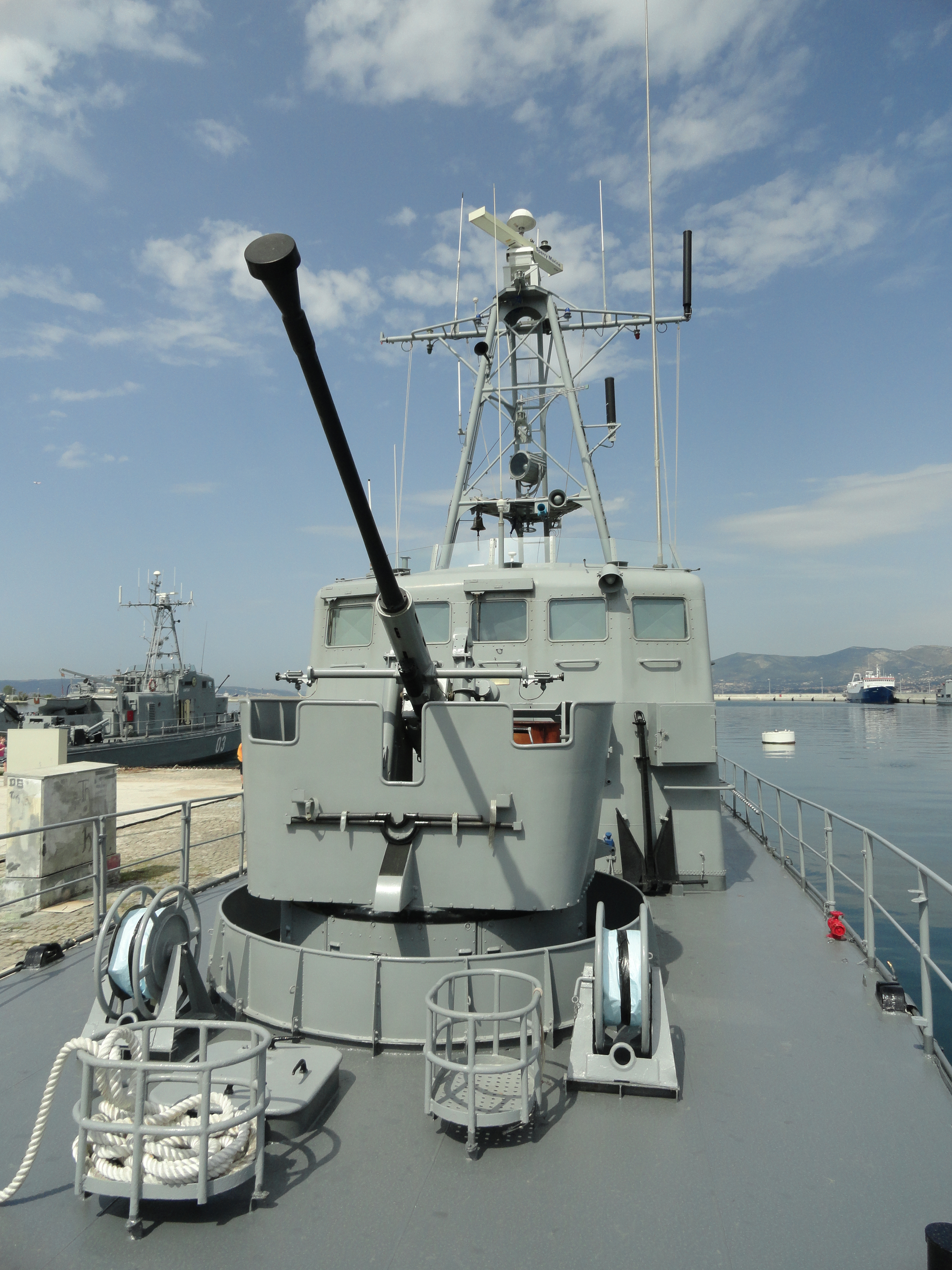
Ship's bow with the 40 mm Bofors gun and the ship's bridge visible

During the evening of 15 November the ship was tugged away by a Croatian fishing ship to the nearby Nečujam cove, where the vessel was beached to prevent her from sinking. In the early hours of the same day, the remaining JRM ships opened fire in retaliation for damaging Mukos. As Yugoslav forces left the area, the ship was towed to an overhauling shipyard in Šibenik on the night of 17/18 November, after being salvaged by HRM divers with the help of Brodospas. The ship was repaired and renamed Šolta, entering service with the HRM on 15 May 1992 with Mile Tomas in command.

The Croatian Coast Guard was formed in October 2007, and Šolta was assigned to the 1st Division, based in Split. During the same year the ship underwent a modernisation that included the installation of a new Sperry Marine radar, gyrocompass and GPS. A second refit that occurred sometime between 2007 and 2013 included the deletion of the Strela launcher and the stern 20 mm M-75 gun to create space needed for a RHIB and a hydraulic crane used to lower it into the sea. The pennant number was changed from OB-62 to OB-02.

== See also ==
- List of active Croatian Navy ships
- List of ships of the Yugoslav Navy
