= Mirna-class patrol boat =

Yugoslav naval ship class

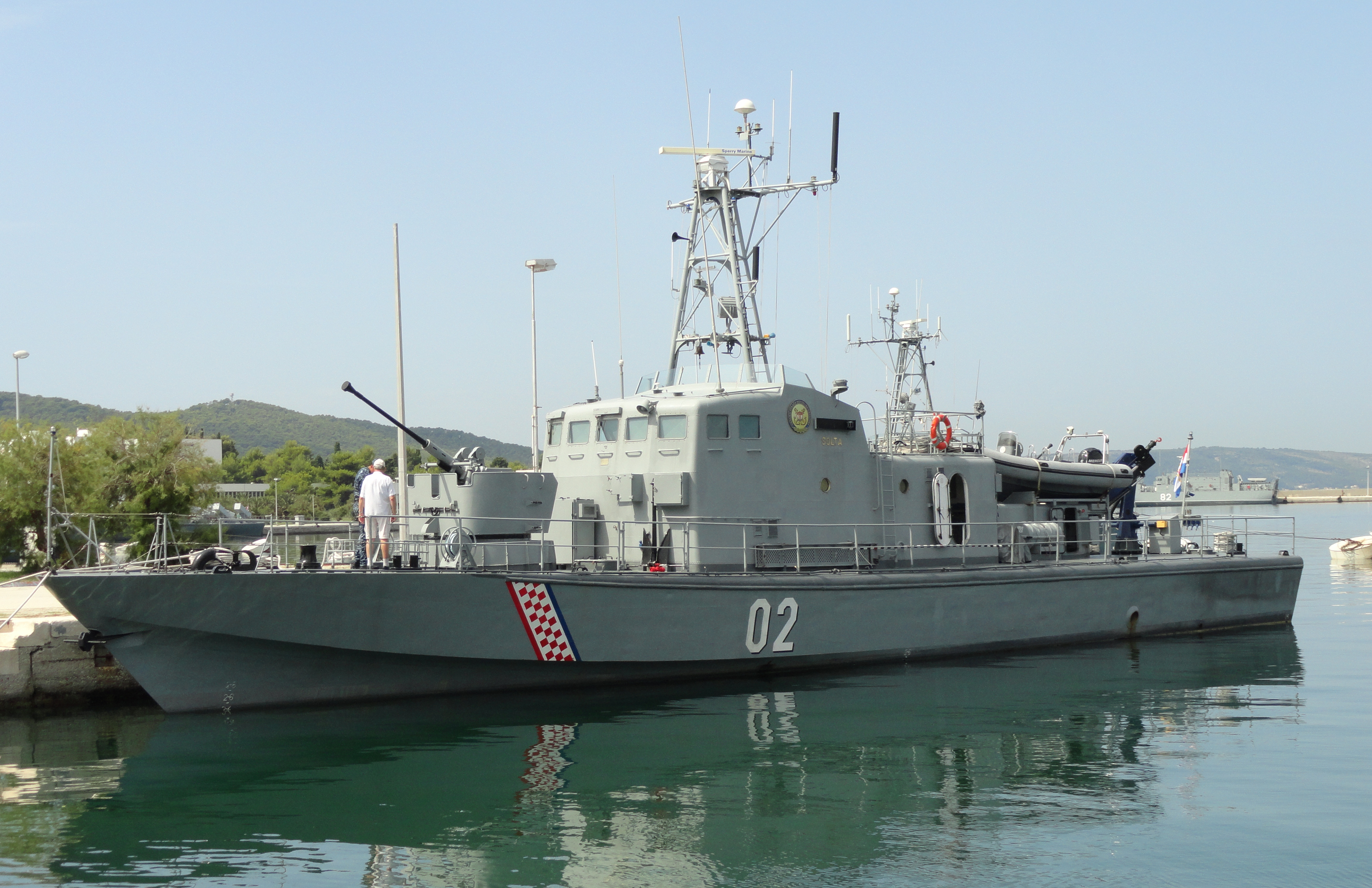
- Šolta (OB-02) photographed in the Lora Naval Base, August 2011

Class overview
- Builders: Tito's Shipyard Kraljevica, Kraljevica, SR Croatia
- Operators: Yugoslav Navy; FR Yugoslav Navy; Croatian Navy
- Preceded by: Type 131
- Succeeded by: Omiš class
- Completed: 11
- Active: 4

General characteristics
- Type: Patrol boat
- Displacement: Standard: 125 t (123 long tons); Full load: 142 t (140 long tons)
- Length: 33.4 m (109 ft 7 in)
- Beam: 6.74 m (22 ft 1 in)
- Draught: 2.3 m (7 ft 7 in)
- Propulsion: Two shafts; fixed pitch propellers; 2 × SEMT Pielstick diesel engines
- Speed: 32 knots (59 km/h); 24 knots (44 km/h) (economical)
- Range: 600 nm at 15 knots
- Complement: ~ 20
- Armament: 1 × Bofors 40 mm (1.6 in) gun; 1 × Hispano M-75 four-barreled 20 mm (0.79 in) gun; 1 × MTU-4 9K32M Strela-2M; 2 × double-barreled 128 mm (5.0 in) illuminator launchers

The Mirna class (referred to as the Type 171 in some sources) is a class of eleven patrol boats built for the Yugoslav Navy (Serbo-Croatian: Jugoslavenska ratna mornarica - JRM) by the Tito's Kraljevica Shipyard. Intended as a replacement for the earlier Type 131 patrol boats, the new class was completed during the early 1980s and commissioned in the JRM Maritime Border Brigade.

== Design ==
Mirna class patrol boats were built between 1979 and 1985 for the needs of Yugoslav navy and were intended mainly for patrolling Yugoslavia's maritime borders, however they can also be outfitted with depth charges for ASW duties and its Simrad SQ3D/SF sonar can detect submarines at ranges up to 1.8 km (1.11 mi). Their hull is made of steel and is divided into seven watertight compartments, while the superstructure is made of aluminum alloy. It is also equipped with Decca RM 1216A navigational radar with maximum range of 88.9 km (55.23 mi). Its crew consists of two officers, five junior officers and fifteen sailors.

== History ==
Following the outbreak of the Croatian War of Independence, two boats were damaged and subsequently captured by Croatian forces, while another two were captured in the Šibenik Shipyard during the Battle of Šibenik. All four were commissioned in the Croatian Navy and are in active service as of 2017. The remaining seven boats were relocated to Boka Kotorska where they became part of the Navy of FR Yugoslavia. All seven were decommissioned during the early 2000s: two were handed over to the Ministry of Interior and scrapped in 2012 after seeing little service, while the remaining five were sold off to civilian owners.

== Boats ==
Name (original)	Pennant number (original)	Launched	Status
Biokovo	PČ-171	1980	Damaged off Škarda by a 9K11 Malyutka missile fired by Croatian naval personnel landed from an armed motor boat and a schooner anchored at a cove in the island on 10 September 1991, limped to Mali Lošinj. Later captured by the Croatian Navy at Šibenik. In operational use as OB-01 Novigrad. Located at Lora Naval Base in Split.
Pohorje	PČ-172	1981	Relocated to Montenegro. Sold to a private owner who uses it as a tourist ship.
Koprivnik	PČ-173	1981	Shelled Šibenik on 17 September 1991, during the Serb assault on the city. Relocated to Montenegro. Sold to a private owner who uses it as a tourist ship.
Učka	PČ-174	1982	Relocated to Montenegro. Transferred to the Ministry of Interior Affairs in 2003 and used by the Naval police since 2005 under the name P-01 Bar. Sold for scrap in 2012.
Grmeč	PČ-175	1982	Relocated to Montenegro. Sold to a private owner from Biograd, Croatia who uses it as a tourist ship.
Mukos	PČ-176	1983	Captured by Croatian forces after being disabled by Croatian naval commandos with an improvised torpedo off Brač during the battle of the Dalmatian Channels, on 14 November 1991. In service with the Croatian Navy as OB-02 Šolta.
Fruška Gora	PČ-177	1983	Relocated to Montenegro. Sold to a private owner who uses it as a tourist ship.
Kosmaj	PČ-178	1983	On 5 October 1991, intercepted and eventually destroyed, together with ground artillery and tank fire, the Croatian coaster Perast in the bay of Slano, . Intercepted and sank a fishing motorboat carrying six Croatian naval commandos in a sabotage mission off Šipan island on 23 October. Only one of the commandos survived. Relocated to Montenegro. Transferred to the Ministry of Interior Affairs in 2003 and used by the Naval police since 2005 under the name P-03 Herceg Novi. Sold for scrap in 2012.
Zelengora	PČ-179	1983	Relocated to Montenegro. Sold to a private owner from Croatia in 2007 who uses it as a tourist ship Iliria.
Cer	PČ-180	1984	Shelled Šibenik on 17 September 1991, during the Yugoslav assault on the city. Captured by Croatian forces on 22 September 1991 after they took over the naval base at Šibenik. In service with the Croatian Navy as OB-03 Cavtat.
Durmitor	PČ-181	1985	Captured by Croatian forces at Šibenik. In service with the Croatian Navy as OB-04 Hrvatska Kostajnica.
