= Heroj-class submarine =

Class of diesel-electric Yugoslav Navy submarines

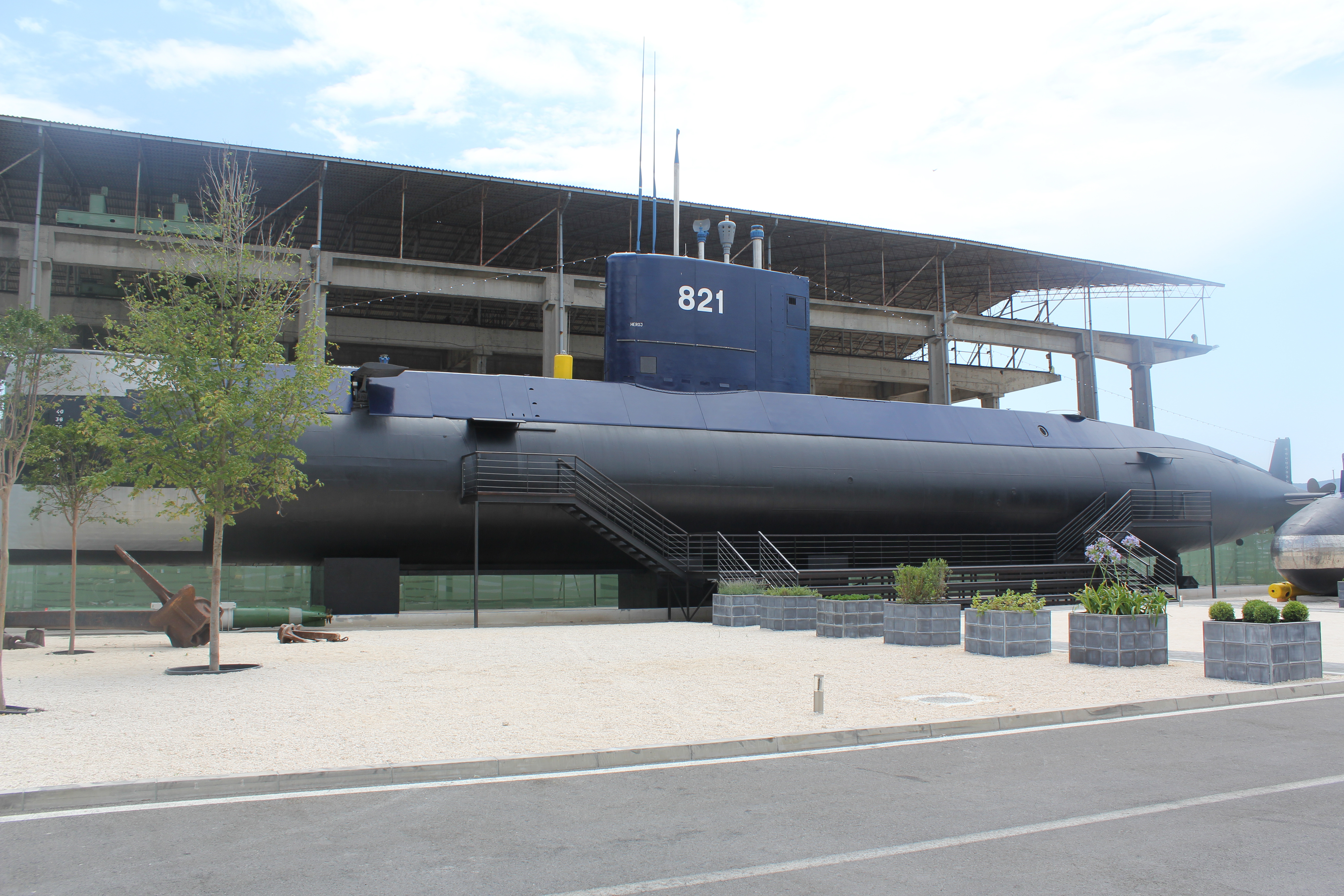
- Heroj (P-821) in the Porto Montenegro Museum.

Class overview
- Builders: Brodogradilište specijalnih objekata (BSO), Split, SR Croatia, SFR Yugoslavia
- Operators: Yugoslav Navy
- Preceded by: Sutjeska class
- Succeeded by: Sava class
- Built: 1964–1970
- In commission: 1968–late 1990s
- Completed: 3

General characteristics
- Displacement: 614 tonnes (604 long tons) (surfaced); 705 tonnes (694 long tons) (submerged)
- Length: 50.4 m (165 ft)
- Depth: 210 m (689 ft 0 in)
- Propulsion: One shaft; diesel-electric; 2 × Mercedes MB 820N diesel engines; 1 × Končar electric motor
- Speed: 20 kn (37 km/h; 23 mph) (surfaced, maximum); 9.8 knots (18 km/h; 11 mph) (submerged)
- Range: 4,100 nmi (7,593 km; 4,718 mi) at 10 knots (19 km/h; 12 mph)
- Complement: 28
- Armament: 4 × 533 mm (1 ft 9.0 in) torpedo tubes for: 6 × torpedoes or; 12 × naval mines

The Heroj class (English: Hero) was a class of diesel-electric attack submarines built for the Yugoslav Navy during the 1960s. The three strong class was the second generation of domestically built submarines, representing a significant improvement compared to the earlier Sutjeska class. Built at the Brodogradilište specijalnih objekata (eng. Special objects shipyard) in Split, the new class featured a streamlined hull design and four bow facing torpedo tubes that could also be used for minelaying.

With the start of the Croatian War of Independence all three boats were relocated from the Lora Naval Base to Montenegro where they were commissioned with the SR Yugoslav Navy. The last two boats of the class, Junak and Uskok, were decommissioned during the 1990s and scrapped. Heroj was decommissioned in 2004 and after restoration laid up at the Porto Montenegro Museum in 2013.

== Description ==
The boats measured 50.40 m (165 ft 4 in) in length with a hull diameter of 6.68 m (21 ft 11 in). Surfaced they displaced 614 t (604 long tons) and 705 t (694 long tons) while underwater. The diesel-electric drive consisted of two Mercedes diesel generators and single Končar electric motor mounted on a single shaft. This enabled them a maximum speed of 15.3 knots (28.3 km/h; 17.6 mph) underwater and 9.8 knots (18.1 km/h; 11.3 mph) when surfaced. Travelling underwater using a snorkel at a speed of 10 knots (19 km/h; 12 mph), the boats had a range of 4,100 nmi (7,600 km; 4,700 mi). Diving depth was 210 m (689 ft 0 in). The boats were crewed by a complement of 28 crew members.

Armament of the class consisted of four 533 mm (1 ft 9.0 in) torpedo tubes used for launching up to six SET-65E active/passive homing torpedoes or deploying up to twelve naval mines instead. The boat's sensor suite included a "Stop Light" radar warning receiver, a "Snoop Group" surface search radar and a Thomson Sintra Eledone hull mounted sonar.

== Boats ==
Name	Pennant number	Namesake	Builder	Laid down	Launched	Commissioned	Decommissioned	Fate
Heroj	P-821	Heroj	Brodogradilište specijalnih objekata, Split, SR Croatia, SFR Yugoslavia	1964	21 August 1967	10 September 1968	1991 (out of service); 2005/2006 (officially decommissioned)	extant; Porto Montenegro museum.
Junak	P-822	Junak	Brodogradilište specijalnih objekata, Split, SR Croatia, SFR Yugoslavia	1965	1968	1969	1997	scrapped in 1997
Uskok	P-823	Uskok	Brodogradilište specijalnih objekata, Split, SR Croatia, SFR Yugoslavia	1966	January 1970	1970	1998/1999	scrapped in 2007

== Service and aftermath ==
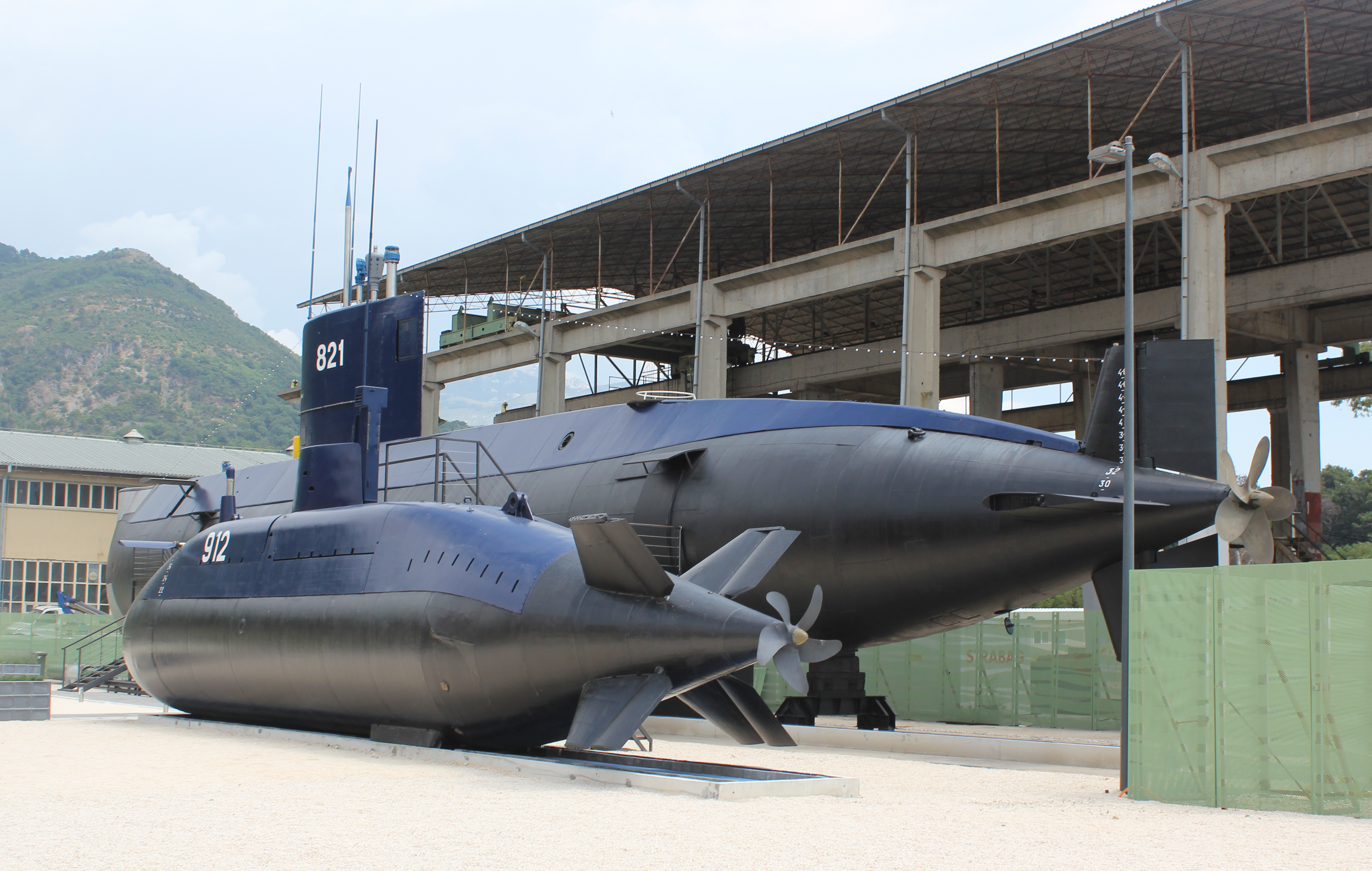
Stern view of Heroj (right) and Una (left)

Heroj was launched on 21 August 1967 sponsored by the commander of the Yugoslav Navy, Admiral Mate Jerković. Before being officially commissioned with the Navy, Heroj underwent a series of sea trials in order to test the maximum operational parameters of the submarine. On one such occasion, Heroj was travelling at a depth of 20 m (66 ft) and slowly accelerating to its maximum underwater speed. When the submarine reached 15.3 knots (28.3 km/h; 17.6 mph), the boat's fiberglass sail collapsed. This in turn affected the hydrodynamics by creating a positive trim and surfacing the submarine at high speed within seconds.

After overcoming these difficulties, the boat was clear for service and was officially commissioned on 10 September 1968. Two other units soon followed with Junak being commissioned in 1969 and Uskok in 1970.

== See also ==
Equivalent submarines of the same era

- Type 206
- Albacora class
- Toti class
- Natsushio class
