= Sutjeska-class submarine =

Class of Yugoslav diesel submarines

Class overview
- Builders: Uljanik Yard, Pula
- Operators: Yugoslav Navy
- Preceded by: Osvetnik-class submarine
- Succeeded by: Heroj-class submarine
- Built: 1957–1962
- In commission: 1962–1987
- Completed: 2
- Retired: 2
- Scrapped: 2

General characteristics
- Type: submarine
- Displacement: 700 tons standard; 820 tons full load surfaced; 945 tons submerged
- Length: 60 m (200 ft)
- Beam: 6.6 m (22 ft)
- Draught: 4.8 m (16 ft)
- Propulsion: 2-shaft diesel electric; 2 × Sulzer diesels (1,800 hp (1,300 kW)); 2 × electric motors
- Speed: 14 knots (26 km/h; 16 mph) surfaced; 9 knots (17 km/h; 10 mph) submerged
- Complement: 38
- Armament: 6 × 533 mm (21.0 in) torpedo tubes (4 bow, 2 stern)

The Sutjeska class was a class of two diesel-electric submarines built for the Yugoslav Navy during the late 1950s and early 1960s. Built by the Uljanik Shipyard in Pula, the two boats were the first class of submarines to be built in Yugoslavia. Their service lives were mostly uneventful and they were retired in the 1980s.

== Design ==
The design was done in Yugoslavia and was vaguely based on Italian Sirena-class submarine, some of which were built at 3. Maj shipyard (formerly known as Cantieri Navali Quarnero). They were already outdated by the time they entered service, however they provided valuable technical experience for future Yugoslav submarine projects. They were equipped with Soviet sensors (radar and sonar). They also went on to be refitted with a modern sonar in the 1970s.

== Boats ==
Name	Pennant number	Namesake	Builder	Laid down	Launched	Commissioned	Fate
Sutjeska	P-811	Battle of the Sutjeska	Uljanik Shipyard, Pula, SR Croatia, SFR Yugoslavia	1957	28 September 1958	16 September 1960	Deleted during the 1980s
Neretva	P-812	Battle of the Neretva	Uljanik Shipyard, Pula, SR Croatia, SFR Yugoslavia	1957	1959	1962	Deleted during the 1980s

== See also ==
Equivalent submarines of the same era

- Daphné class
- Draken class
- Hayashio class
