= German submarine U-511 =

German World War II submarine

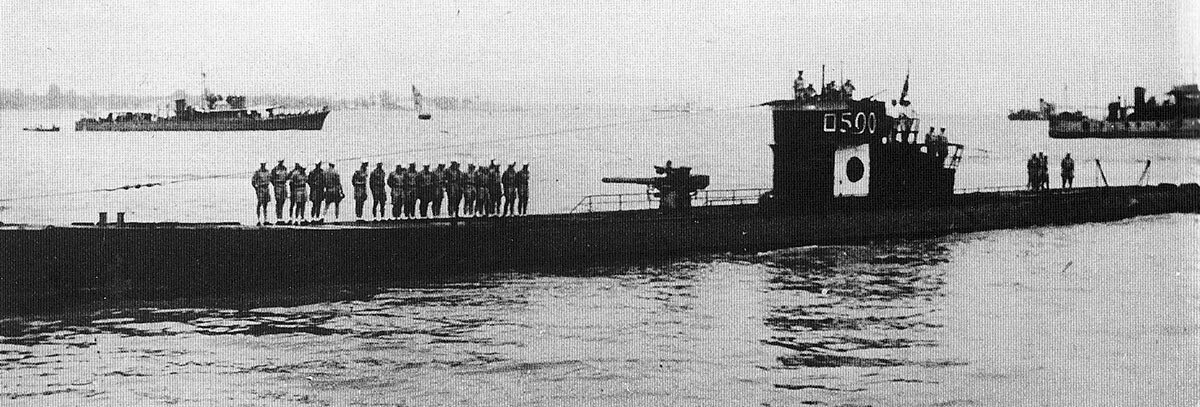
- U-511 as Ro-500 in 1943

History

Nazi Germany
- Name: U-511
- Ordered: 20 October 1939
- Builder: Deutsche Werft, Hamburg
- Yard number: 307
- Laid down: 21 February 1941
- Launched: 22 September 1941
- Commissioned: 8 December 1941
- Fate: Sold to Japan on 16 September 1943

Empire of Japan
- Name: Ro-500
- Acquired: 16 September 1943
- Fate: Surrendered in August 1945; Scuttled on 30 April 1946

General characteristics
- Class & type: Type IXC submarine
- Displacement: 1,120 t (1,100 long tons) surfaced; 1,232 t (1,213 long tons) submerged
- Length: 76.76 m (251 ft 10 in) o/a; 58.75 m (192 ft 9 in) pressure hull
- Beam: 6.76 m (22 ft 2 in) o/a; 4.40 m (14 ft 5 in) pressure hull
- Height: 9.60 m (31 ft 6 in)
- Draught: 4.70 m (15 ft 5 in)
- Installed power: 4,400 PS (3,200 kW; 4,300 bhp) (diesels); 1,000 PS (740 kW; 990 shp) (electric)
- Propulsion: 2 shafts; 2 × diesel engines; 2 × electric motors
- Speed: 18.3 knots (33.9 km/h; 21.1 mph) surfaced; 7.7 knots (14.3 km/h; 8.9 mph) submerged
- Range: 13,450 nmi (24,910 km; 15,480 mi) at 10 knots (19 km/h; 12 mph) surfaced; 64 nmi (119 km; 74 mi) at 4 knots (7.4 km/h; 4.6 mph) submerged
- Test depth: 230 m (750 ft)
- Complement: 4 officers, 44 enlisted
- Armament: 6 × torpedo tubes (4 bow, 2 stern); 22 × 53.3 cm (21 in) torpedoes; 1 × 10.5 cm (4.1 in) SK C/32 deck gun (180 rounds); 1 × 3.7 cm (1.5 in) SK C/30 AA gun; 1 × 2 cm FlaK 30 AA guns

Service record (Kriegsmarine)
- Part of: 4th U-boat Flotilla; 8 December 1941 – 31 July 1942; 10th U-boat Flotilla; 1 August 1942 – 1 September 1943
- Identification codes: M 42 792
- Commanders: Kptlt. Friedrich Steinhoff; 8 December 1941 – 17 December 1942; Kptlt. Fritz Schneewind; 18 December 1942 – 20 November 1943
- Operations: 4 patrols: 1st patrol: 16 July – 29 September 1942; 2nd patrol: 24 October – 28 November 1942; 3rd patrol: 31 December 1942 – 8 March 1943; 4th patrol: 10 May – 7 August 1943
- Victories: 5 merchant ships sunk (41,373 GRT); 1 merchant ship damaged (8,773 GRT)

Service record (IJN)
- Part of: Kure Naval District Force; 16 September 1943 – 5 May 1945; 51st Squadron; 5 May – August 1945
- Commanders: Kaigun-shōsa Kiyoshi Taoka; 16 September – 3 December 1943; Kaigun-tai-i Sadao Uesugi; 3 December 1943 – 31 January 1944; Kaigun-tai-i Toshio Yamazaki; 31 January – 30 April 1944; Kaigun-tai-i Mitsuo Shiizuka; 30 April – 5 July 1944; Kaigun-tai-i Norio Yamamoto; 5 July – 15 September 1944; Kaigun-tai-i Yasuhisa Yamamoto; 15 September 1944 – August 1945
- Operations: None
- Victories: None

German submarine U-511 was a Type IXC U-boat of Nazi Germany's Kriegsmarine during World War II. The submarine was laid down on 21 February 1941 at the Deutsche Werft yard in Hamburg as yard number 307, launched on 22 September 1941 and commissioned on 8 December 1941 under the command of Kapitänleutnant Friedrich Steinhoff.

After training with the 4th U-boat Flotilla, from May 1942, U-511 was used for testing the possibility of launching Wurfkörper 42 30 cm (12 in) artillery rockets from U-boats. In cooperation with the commanding officer's brother Ernst Steinhoff of the Peenemünde Army Research Center, a rack of six rockets were mounted on deck, and were successfully launched while on the surface and while submerged up to a depth of 12 metres (39 ft). However, the rockets were not particularly accurate and the racks on the deck had a negative effect on the U-boat's underwater handling and performance, so the project was abandoned.

The U-boat was attached to the 10th U-boat Flotilla for front-line service on 1 August 1942. In that role she carried out four war patrols, two commanded by Kptlt. Steinhoff, and two by Kptlt. Fritz Schneewind, sinking five ships totalling 41,373 gross register tons (GRT) and damaging one of 8,773 GRT.

The U-boat was transferred to Japan on 16 September 1943 and served in the Imperial Japanese Navy as submarine Ro-500 (呂500), spending its career as a training ship in Japanese home waters, until August 1945 when she surrendered to the Allies.

== Design ==
German Type IXC submarines were slightly larger than the original Type IXBs. U-511 had a displacement of 1,120 tonnes (1,100 long tons) when at the surface and 1,232 tonnes (1,213 long tons) while submerged. The U-boat had a total length of 76.76 m (251 ft 10 in), a pressure hull length of 58.75 m (192 ft 9 in), a beam of 6.76 m (22 ft 2 in), a height of 9.60 m (31 ft 6 in), and a draught of 4.70 m (15 ft 5 in). The submarine was powered by two MAN M 9 V 40/46 supercharged four-stroke, nine-cylinder diesel engines producing a total of 4,400 metric horsepower (3,240 kW; 4,340 shp) for use while surfaced, two Siemens-Schuckert 2 GU 345/34 double-acting electric motors producing a total of 1,000 shaft horsepower (1,010 PS; 750 kW) for use while submerged. She had two shafts and two 1.92 m (6 ft) propellers. The boat was capable of operating at depths of up to 230 metres (750 ft).

The submarine had a maximum surface speed of 18.3 knots (33.9 km/h; 21.1 mph) and a maximum submerged speed of 7.3 knots (13.5 km/h; 8.4 mph). When submerged, the boat could operate for 63 nautical miles (117 km; 72 mi) at 4 knots (7.4 km/h; 4.6 mph); when surfaced, she could travel 13,450 nautical miles (24,910 km; 15,480 mi) at 10 knots (19 km/h; 12 mph). U-511 was fitted with six 53.3 cm (21 in) torpedo tubes (four fitted at the bow and two at the stern), 22 torpedoes, one 10.5 cm (4.13 in) SK C/32 naval gun, 180 rounds, and a 3.7 cm (1.5 in) SK C/30 as well as a 2 cm (0.79 in) C/30 anti-aircraft gun. The boat had a complement of forty-eight.

== Service history ==
=== First patrol ===
On 16 July 1942 U-511 sailed from Kiel and across the Atlantic to the Caribbean Sea.

At 06:29 on 27 August, U-511 fired a spread of four torpedoes at Convoy TAW-15, en route from Trinidad to Key West, about 120 nautical miles (220 km; 140 mi) south-south-east of Guantánamo Bay in Cuba, sinking two ships and damaging another. The 13,031 GRT British tanker San Fabian, loaded with 18,000 tons of fuel oil, was hit and sunk. The master, 31 crewmen and one gunner were picked up by the destroyer USS Lea and the patrol craft PC-38, 23 crew members and three gunners were lost. The 8,968 GRT Dutch tanker Rotterdam, carrying 11,364 tons of gasoline was struck and immediately began to settle by the stern. The 37 survivors of her crew of 47 abandoned the ship in lifeboats and were picked up by USS SC-522. The 8,773 GRT American tanker Esso Aruba, loaded with 104,170 barrels (16,562 m^{3}) of diesel fuel and serving as the flagship of the convoy commodore, was hit by a single torpedo on the port side which badly damaged the ship, but left the engines and steering gear still operating. This allowed the ship, in danger of breaking in two, to proceed under her own power to Guantánamo Bay, arriving the next day. The ship was beached and her cargo unloaded. After temporary repairs the ship proceeded to Galveston, Texas, and was returned to service in February 1943.

The U-boat arrived at her new home port of Lorient in occupied France, on 29 September after a voyage lasting 76 days.

=== Second patrol ===
U-511 sailed from Lorient on 24 October 1942, and patrolled the waters off the coast of north-west Africa before returning to base after 36 days, on 28 November, having had no successes.

=== Third patrol ===
U-511, now under the command of Oberleutnant zur See Fritz Schneewind, left Lorient once more on 31 December 1942 to patrol the waters between Spain, the Canary Islands and the Azores. At 21:42 on 9 January 1943 she had her only success, sinking the 5,004 GRT British merchant ship William Wilberforce, loaded with 5,054 tons of West African produce, including palm kernels, palm oil and rubber en route from Lagos to Liverpool. The unescorted ship was torpedoed west of the Canary Islands, with the loss of three crewmen. The master, 41 crewmen, six gunners and 12 passengers were later picked up by the Spanish merchant ship Monte Arnabal.

U-511 returned to Lorient on 8 March after 68 days at sea.

=== Fourth patrol ===
U-511's final patrol took her all the way to Japan, as part of the ongoing programme of technological exchange. She had aboard additional personnel, including Ernst Woermann, the German ambassador to the pro-Japanese Wang Jingwei regime in China, Vice Admiral Naokuni Nomura, the Japanese naval attaché in Berlin, and German scientists and engineers. Leaving Lorient on 10 May 1943 under the command of the now Kapitänleutnant Fritz Schneewind, she sailed through the Atlantic and around the Cape of Good Hope into the Indian Ocean where she made two kills.

The first attack was made at 09:42 on 27 June, when she hit the unescorted 7,194 GRT American Liberty ship Sebastian Cermeno with two torpedoes, disabling the engines and killing an officer and two men. The survivors abandoned ship in five lifeboats. Ten minutes after being hit, the ship sank. The U-boat surfaced and questioned the survivors before leaving. The lifeboats lost contact with each other, but all were eventually rescued by Allied ships, apart from one boat which made its own way to Madagascar. Her second success came on 9 July when she torpedoed the 7,176 GRT American Liberty ship Samuel Heintzelman, loaded with 5,644 tons of ammunition and general cargo. The U-boat dived after firing and did not directly observe the results, but heard underwater explosions. On surfacing they saw no trace of the ship, only floating debris. There were no survivors from the 75 men on board. The ship was reported missing, and was at first believed to have been sunk by a Japanese surface raider. On 30 September, wreckage from the ship was discovered off the Maldives.

The U-boat arrived at Kure on 7 August after a voyage lasting 90 days and was handed over to Japan on 16 September.

=== Japanese service ===
After being commissioned in the Imperial Japanese Navy as Ro-500, in September 1943 it was examined by a team of Japanese naval engineers. Several elements of the Type IXC design were later incorporated into the I-201-class. The boat's German crew trained Japanese personnel in its handling, then departed for Penang in late September. Starting in November 1943, Ro-500 was assigned to the Naval Submarine School at Ōtake as a training ship.

In May 1944, Ro-500 was assigned to Submarine Division 33 along with Ro-62, Ro-63, and Ro-64. That month Ro-500 participated in testing anti-submarine warfare equipment with dive bombers from the 634th Naval Air Group. From July 1944 to May 1945, it was used for training purposes in the Kure Naval District, before being reassigned to the 51st Squadron along with Ro-68 and sent from Kure to the Maizuru naval base. For the rest of the war, Ro-500 was at Maizuru to help train air crews in anti-submarine warfare by simulating an American submarine. After Japan's surrender, the crew of Ro-500, led by Lieutenant Yasuhisa Yamamoto, joined the rebels that wanted to continue the war against the Soviets. They departed from Maizuru on 18 August 1945, but the 6th Fleet headquarters contacted the crew, and the same day Ro-500 returned to Maizuru.

=== Fate ===
Ro-500 was scuttled in the Gulf of Maizuru along with the Japanese submarines I-121 and Ro-68 by the United States Navy on 30 April 1946.

In 2018, an expedition led by the Society La Plongee for Deep Sea Technology discovered the wrecks of Ro-500 and I-121 in Wakasa Bay off the coast of Kyoto Prefecture.

== Summary of raiding history ==
Date	Ship	Flag	GRT	Notes
27 August 1942	Esso Aruba	United States	8,773	Damaged
27 August 1942	Rotterdam	Netherlands	8,968	Sunk
27 August 1942	San Fabian	Merchant Navy	13,031	Sunk
9 January 1943	William Wilberforce	Merchant Navy	5,004	Sunk
27 June 1943	Sebastin Cermeno	United States	7,194	Sunk
9 July 1943	Samuel Heintzelman	United States	7,176	Sunk

== Bibliography ==
- Bishop, Chris (2006). Kriegsmarine U-Boats, 1939–45. London: Amber Books. ISBN 978-1-904687-96-2.
- Busch, Rainer; Röll, Hans-Joachim (1999). German U-boat commanders of World War II : a biographical dictionary. Translated by Brooks, Geoffrey. London, Annapolis, Md: Greenhill Books, Naval Institute Press. ISBN 1-55750-186-6.
- Busch, Rainer; Röll, Hans-Joachim (1999). Deutsche U-Boot-Verluste von September 1939 bis Mai 1945 [German U-boat losses from September 1939 to May 1945]. Der U-Boot-Krieg (in German). Vol. IV. Hamburg, Berlin, Bonn: Mittler. ISBN 3-8132-0514-2.
- Gröner, Erich; Jung, Dieter; Maass, Martin (1991). U-boats and Mine Warfare Vessels. German Warships 1815–1945. Vol. 2. Translated by Thomas, Keith; Magowan, Rachel. London: Conway Maritime Press. ISBN 0-85177-593-4.
