= Ro-57 =

Ro-57 may refer to:

- IMAM Ro.57, an Italian fighter aircraft of 1939
- Japanese submarine Ro-57, an Imperial Japanese Navy submarine in commission from 1922 to 1945
- Ro-57-class submarine, an alternative name for the Type L3 subclass of the Japanese Type L submarine
