= Ro-60 =

Ro-60 may refer to:

- Japanese submarine Ro-60, an Imperial Japanese Navy submarine commissioned in 1923 and wrecked in 1941
- Ro-60-class submarine, an alternative name for the L4 subclass of the Japanese Type L submarine
