= 4th Fleet (Imperial Japanese Navy) =

Fleet of the Imperial Japanese Navy

The 4th Fleet was a fleet of the Imperial Japanese Navy. The Fourth Fleet designation was used during three separate periods. The initial designation was for a group of ships that were assigned to work together during the Russo-Japanese conflict and the period of its immediate aftermath. The second time the designation was used was during the Sino-Japanese conflict, and the third time was as a South Pacific area of command during the middle of the Pacific War.

== History ==
=== Russo-Japanese War ===
First established on June 14, 1905, the 4th Fleet was created after the Battle of Tsushima in the Russo-Japanese War specifically to support and cover the landings of Japanese forces in Sakhalin. Afterwards, it was sent to the United States with the Japanese delegation negotiating the Treaty of Portsmouth ending the war, and was disbanded on December 20, 1905.

=== The Fourth Fleet Incident ===
The Fourth Fleet was temporarily resurrected during a war game exercise executed in 1935, playing the role of the opposition force under the command of Hajime Matsushita. While participating in field manoeuvres, the Fourth Fleet became caught in extremely foul weather. The weather continued to deteriorate and by 26 September had reached typhoon status. Two of the newer, large Special Type destroyers, Hatsuyuki and Yūgiri, had their bows torn away by the heavy seas. A number of recently built heavy cruisers also suffered significant structural damage. Myōkō, Mogami and the submarine tender Taigei developed serious cracks in their hulls, and the light aircraft-carriers Hōshō and Ryūjō suffered damage to their flight decks and superstructure, with Ryūjō also having her hangar section flooded. The minelayer Itsukushima suffered damage that required several months for extensive repairs, necessitating a near complete rebuild. Nearly all the fleet's destroyers suffered damage to their superstructures, and fifty-four crewmen were lost, swept overboard or killed outright.

The Japanese Admiralty held a hearing on the damage suffered by Fourth Fleet in the storm, resulting in recommendations for changes on Japanese warship design and construction. A number of new designs that used heavier guns and taller superstructures were found to be top-heavy, and efforts were made to stabilize these ships by reducing weight above the waterline. In addition, cracks in the hulls of the new cruisers indicated the recently adopted practice of electric welding hull seams was suspect, and the practice was canceled on all new Japanese warship construction. The event was kept a secret from the public.

=== Second Sino-Japanese War ===
On October 20, 1937, the 4th Fleet was resurrected as part of the emergency reinforcement program for the China Area Fleet after the North China Incident of 1937. The new 4th fleet was based out of Qingdao and assigned to patrol the Bohai Sea and the East China Sea regions. However, unlike the IJN 5th Fleet, the 4th Fleet was never in actual combat. On November 15, 1939, the 4th Fleet was absorbed into the 3rd China Expeditionary Fleet under the overall aegis of the China Area Fleet. Although most of its ships were released for service with the Combined Fleet in the Pacific War a year later, most of the staff for the 4th Fleet remained in China, and were assigned to the Qingdao Base Force for the duration of the war.

=== Pacific War ===
On the same date that the 4th Fleet was absorbed into the China Area Fleet, a new 4th Fleet was created to provide administrative control over Japanese naval forces in the Japanese-held island territories of the South Pacific (Caroline Islands, Marshall Islands, Mariana Islands, Palau). This third IJN 4th Fleet came under the aegis of the Combined Fleet on November 15, 1940. The operational name of this fleet was the South Seas Force (南洋部隊, Nan'yō butai). With the start of hostilities against the United States, the 4th Fleet was based out of Truk, with a secondary base at Kwajalein. After initial Japanese successes, additional bases were established in the southern Philippines, Guam, Wake Island, Gilbert Islands, eastern New Guinea, Bismarck Archipelago and the Solomon Islands.

After the Battle of the Coral Sea, the area covered by the 4th Fleet was reduced to an “inner core” of Japanese possessions, while the new IJN 8th Fleet was assigned to confront the advancing American forces in the Solomon Islands and New Guinea. However, in November 1943, the Americans attacked the Gilbert Islands and captured the major naval base of Tarawa, which brought the 4th Fleet and its various garrison forces back into the front lines of combat.

The Americans continued to advance through the Marshall Islands in early 1944, neutralizing the Japanese bastion at Truk Atoll in the Carolines, headquarters of the IJN 4th Fleet, by means of powerful naval air strikes in February, and forcing the removal of Japan's major naval units to Palau, which also proved vulnerable to air attack.

In March 1944, the IJN 4th Fleet came under operational control of the Central Pacific Area Fleet based in Saipan. It effectively ceased to exist with the fall of Saipan to American forces.

== Structure ==
=== Russo-Japanese War ===
- Cruiser Division 7 (Chinen, Iki, Okinoshima, Mishima)
- Cruiser Division 8 (Itsukushima, Hashidate, Matsushima)
- Cruiser Division 9 (Chokai, Maya, Akagi, Uji, Destroyer Squadrons 1, 10, 11, 15 and 20)
- Auxiliaries: Manshu, Tanan-maru.

=== Second Sino-Japanese War ===
- Flagship: Ashigara
- Cruiser Division 9: Myōkō, Nagara
- Cruiser Division 14: Tenryū, Tatsuta
- No.4 Torpedo Squadron: Kiso,
  - Destroyer Division 6
  - Destroyer Division 10
  - Destroyer Division 11
- No.5 Torpedo Squadron: Natori
  - Destroyer Division 5
  - Destroyer Division 22

=== Order of Battle at time of Pearl Harbor ===
- Flagship: Kashima
- Cruiser Division 18 (Wake Invasion Task Force, based at Kwajalein)
  - Tenryū
  - Tatsuta
  - Armed merchant cruisers Kongō Maru and Kinryu Maru
- Destroyer Squadron 6 (partial)
  - Yubari
  - Destroyer Division 29 (Hayate, Oite)
  - Destroyer Division 30 Kisaragi, Mochizuki, Mutsuki, Yayoi
  - Maizuru 2nd SNLF
- Minesweeper Division 19 (Gilbert Island Invasion Task Force)
  - Tenyo Maru
  - Tokiwa (converted to minelayer)
  - Okinoshima
  - Tsugaru
  - Nagata Maru (Troopship)
- Destroyer Squadron 6 (partial)
  - Destroyer Division 29 (Asanagi, Yūnagi)
- Submarine Squadron 7 (based at Kwajalein)
  - Submarine tender Jingei
  - Submarine Division 26 (Ro-60, Ro-61, Ro-62)
  - Submarine Division 27 (Ro-65, Ro-66, Ro-67)
  - Submarine Division 28 (Ro-63, Ro-64, Ro-68)
- No.3 Base Force (Palau)
- No.4 Base Force (Truk)
- No.5 Base Force (Saipan)
  - Minesweeper Division 15 (Fumi Maru No. 2, Seki Maru No. 3)
  - Gunboat Division 7 (Hirotama Maru, Shotoku Maru)
  - Subchaser Division 59 (subchasers Shonan Maru No. 5, Shonan Maru No. 6; netlayer Shofuku Maru)
  - Subchaser Division 60 (subchasers Kyo Maru No. 8, Kyo Maru No. 10; netlayer Shuko Maru)
- No.6 Base Force (Kwajalein)
  - From 1943, No.3 Special Base Force (Tarawa) for the Gilbert Islands, Nauru and Ocean Island
- No.24 Air Flotilla
  - Seaplane tender Kiyokawa Maru
  - Seaplane tender Kamoi
  - Aircraft Transport Goshū Maru
  - Yokohama Air Group
  - Chitose Air Group

== Commanders of the 4th Fleet ==
=== 1st Creation (Russo-Japanese War) ===
| Commander-in-Chief | | Dates | | Previous Post | Next Post | Notes |
|---|---|---|---|---|---|---|
| 1 | Vice-Admiral; Dewa Shigetō 出羽重遠 | 14 June 1905 | 20 December 1905 | | Commander-in-chief; 2nd Fleet | |

| Chief of Staff | | Dates | | Previous Post | Next Post | Notes |
|---|---|---|---|---|---|---|
| 1 | Captain; Yamaya Tanin 山屋他人 | 14 June 1905 | 20 December 1905 | | | |

=== 2nd Creation (2nd Sino-Japanese War) ===
| Commander-in-Chief | | Dates | | Previous Post | Next Post | Notes |
|---|---|---|---|---|---|---|
| 1 | Vice-Admiral; Toyoda Soemu 豊田副武 | 20 October 1937 | 15 November 1938 | | Commander-in-chief; 2nd Fleet | |
| 2 | Vice-Admiral; Hibino Masaharu 日比野正治 | 15 November 1938 | 15 November 1939 | | | |

| Chief of Staff | | Dates | | Previous Post | Next Post | Notes |
|---|---|---|---|---|---|---|
| 1 | Captain; Kobayashi Masami 小林仁 | 20 October 1937 | 1 September 1938 | | | Promoted to rear admiral 1 December 1937 |
| 2 | Captain; Oka Arata 岡新 | 1 September 1938 | 15 November 1939 | | | Promoted to rear admiral 15 November 1938 |

On 15 November 1939 the 4th Fleet was reorganized into the 3rd China Expeditionary Fleet. Command History continues there.

=== 3rd Creation (Pacific War) ===
Commander in chief
| Rank | Name | Date |
|---|---|---|
| Vice-Admiral | Eikichi Katagiri | 15 Nov 1939 – 15 Nov 1940 |
| Admiral | Shiro Takasu | 15 Nov 1940 – 11 Aug 1941 |
| Admiral | Shigeyoshi Inoue | 11 Aug 1941 – 26 Oct 1942 |
| Vice-Admiral | Baron Tomoshige Samejima | 26 Oct 1942 – 1 Apr 1943 |
| Vice-Admiral | Masami Kobayashi | 1 Apr 1943 – 19 Feb 1944 |
| Vice-Admiral | Chuichi Hara | 19 Feb 1944 – 2 Sep 1945 |

Chief of Staff
| Rank | Name | Date |
|---|---|---|
| Vice-Admiral | Fukuji Kishi | 15 Nov 1939 – 10 Oct 1941 |
| Vice-Admiral | Shikazo Yano | 10 Oct 1941 – 1 Nov 1942 |
| Rear-Admiral | Shunsaku Nabeshima | 1 Nov 1942 – 6 Jan 1944 |
| Rear-Admiral | Michio Sumikawa | 6 Jan 1944 – 30 Mar 1944 |
| Vice-Admiral | Kaoru Arima | 30 Mar 1944 – 12 Aug 1944 |
| Rear-Admiral | Michio Sumikawa | 12 Aug 1944 – 2 Sep 1945 |
