= Japanese submarine Ro-61 =

History

Japan
- Name: Submarine No. 72
- Builder: Mitsubishi, Kobe, Japan
- Laid down: 5 June 1922
- Launched: 19 May 1923
- Completed: 9 February 1924
- Commissioned: 9 February 1924
- Renamed: Ro-60 on 1 November 1924
- Decommissioned: 1 November 1929
- Recommissioned: 1 December 1930
- Decommissioned: 4 November 1931
- Recommissioned: 16 July 1934
- Decommissioned: 15 December 1934
- Recommissioned: 15 November 1940
- Fate: Sunk 31 August 1942
- Stricken: 20 October 1942

General characteristics
- Class & type: Type L4 (Ro-60-class) submarine
- Displacement: 988 long tons (1,004 t) (surfaced); 1,301 tons (1,322 t) (submerged)
- Length: 78.39 m (257 ft 2 in)
- Beam: 7.41 m (24 ft 4 in)
- Draft: 3.96 m (13 ft 0 in)
- Propulsion: 2 × Vickers diesels, 2 shafts 2,400 bhp (surfaced), 1,600 (submerged)
- Speed: 15.7 knots (29.1 km/h) (surfaced); 8.6 knots (15.9 km/h) (submerged)
- Range: 5,500 nautical miles (10,200 km) at 10 knots (19 km/h) (surfaced); 80 nautical miles (150 km) at 5.7 knots (10.6 km/h) (submerged)
- Test depth: 60 m (200 ft)
- Complement: 48
- Armament: 6 × 533 mm torpedo tubes (6 × bow); 12 × 6th Year Type torpedoes; 1 × 76.2 mm (3.00 in) L/40 naval gun; 1 × 6.5 mm machine gun

Ro-61, originally named Submarine No. 72, was an Imperial Japanese Navy Type L submarine of the L4 subclass. She was in commission at various times from 1923 to 1934, and was recommissioned in 1940. Before World War II, she served in the waters of Japan. During World War II, she took part in the Battle of Wake Island and the Aleutian Islands campaign, conducting the first attack on an enemy ship ever carried out by a Japanese Ro-type submarine. She was sunk in August 1942.

== Design and description ==
The submarines of the Type L4 sub-class were copies of the Group 3 subclass of the British L-class submarine built under license in Japan. They were slightly larger and had two more torpedo tubes than the preceding submarines of the L3 subclass. They displaced 1,004 tonnes (988 long tons) surfaced and 1,322 tonnes (1,301 long tons) submerged. The submarines were 78.39 meters (257 ft 2 in) long and had a beam of 7.41 meters (24 ft 4 in) and a draft of 3.96 meters (13 ft 0 in). They had a diving depth of 60 meters (197 ft).

For surface running, the submarines were powered by two 1,200-brake-horsepower (895 kW) Vickers diesel engines, each driving one propeller shaft. When submerged, each propeller was driven by an 800-shaft-horsepower (597 kW) electric motor. They could reach 15.7 knots (29.1 km/h; 18.1 mph) on the surface and 8.6 knots (15.9 km/h; 9.9 mph) underwater. On the surface, they had a range of 5,500 nautical miles (10,200 km; 6,300 mi) at 10 knots (19 km/h; 12 mph); submerged, they had a range of 80 nmi (150 km; 92 mi) at 4 knots (7.4 km/h; 4.6 mph).

The submarines were armed with six internal 533 mm (21 in) torpedo tubes, all in the bow, and carried a total of twelve 6th Year Type torpedoes. They were also armed with a single 76.2 mm (3 in) deck gun and a 6.5 mm machine gun.

== Construction and commissioning ==
Ro-61 was laid down as Submarine No. 72 on 5 June 1922 by Mitsubishi at Kobe, Japan. Launched on 19 May 1923, she was completed and commissioned on 9 February 1924.

== Service history ==
=== Pre-World War II ===
Upon commissioning, Submarine No. 72 was attached to the Sasebo Naval District and assigned to Submarine Division 26 — in which she spent the remainder of her career — and to the Sasebo Defense Division. On 1 April 1924, Submarine Division 26 was reassigned to Submarine Squadron 1 in the 1st Fleet. Submarine No. 72 was renamed Ro-61 on 1 November 1924.

On 1 December 1925, Submarine Division 26 was reassigned to Submarine Squadron 2 in the 2nd Fleet in the Combined Fleet. On 1 March 1926, Ro-61 and the submarines Ro-57, Ro-58, Ro-59, Ro-60, Ro-62, Ro-63, Ro-64, and Ro-68 departed Sasebo, Japan, bound for Okinawa, which they reached the same day. The nine submarines got underway from Okinawa on 30 March 1926 for a training cruise in Chinese waters off Shanghai and Amoy which concluded with their arrival at Mako in the Pescadores Islands on 5 April 1926. They departed Mako on 20 April 1926 for the return leg of their training cruise, operating off China near Chusan Island, then returned to Sasebo on 26 April 1926. In June 1926, Ro-61 took part in underwater habitability tests, during which a dummy torpedo exploded and poisoned 20 sailors; they received treatment aboard the submarine tender Jingei.

On 15 December 1926, Submarine Division 26 returned to the Sasebo Naval District and the Sasebo Defense Division. On 27 March 1927, Ro-60, Ro-61, Ro-62, Ro-63, Ro-64, and Ro-68 departed Saeki Bay, Japan, for a training cruise off Qingdao, China, which they concluded with their arrival at Sasebo, Japan, on 16 May 1927. On 10 December 1928, Submarine Division 26 again was assigned to Submarine Squadron 1 in the 1st Fleet. Ro-61 was decommissioned on 1 November 1929 and placed in Third Reserve at Sasebo.

Ro-61 was recommissioned on 1 December 1930, and that day Submarine Division 26 was reassigned to the Sasebo Naval District. Ro-61 again was decommissioned on 4 November 1931. Recommissioned on 16 July 1934, she served with Submarine Division 26 in the Sasebo Naval District until 15 December 1934, when she again was placed in reserve at Sasebo. and while in Second Reserve was assigned to the Sasebo Guard Squadron from 15 November 1934 to 15 November 1935. She moved to Third Reserve on 15 December 1938 and to Fourth Reserve on 15 November 1939.

Ro-61 again was recommissioned on 15 November 1940, and that day Submarine Division 26 was reassigned to Submarine Squadron 7 in the 4th Fleet in the Combined Fleet. When the Imperial Japanese Navy deployed for the upcoming conflict in the Pacific, Ro-61 was at Kwajalein in the Marshall Islands. She received the message "Climb Mount Niitaka 1208" (Japanese: Niitakayama nobore 1208) from the Combined Fleet on 2 December 1941, indicating that war with the Allies would commence on 8 December 1941 Japan time, which was on 7 December 1941 on the other side of the International Date Line in Hawaii, where Japanese plans called for the war to open with their attack on Pearl Harbor.

=== World War II ===
==== Central Pacific ====
Ro-61 was with the other submarines of Submarine Division 26 — Ro-60 and Ro-62 — at Kwajalein when Japan entered World War II on 8 December 1941, Kwajalein time. The three submarines were placed on "standby alert" that day as United States Marine Corps forces on Wake Island threw back the first Japanese attempt to invade the atoll. On 12 December 1941, Ro-60 and Ro-61 got underway from Kwajalein to support a second, heavily reinforced Japanese attempt to invade Wake Island. Ro-62 followed on 14 December 1941.

The Battle of Wake Island ended as Wake Island fell to the Japanese on 23 December 1941. Ro-61 saw no action off Wake and returned to Kwajalein on 27 December 1941. She and Ro-62 were reassigned to the Marshalls Area Guard Unit on 5 January 1942 and patrolled off Kwajalein thereafter.

Carrier aircraft of United States Navy Task Force 8 raided Kwajalein on 1 February 1942. Two hours later, the Japanese 6th Fleet ordered the submarines of Submarine Squadron 1 — Ro-61, Ro-62, I-9, I-15, I-17, I-19, I-23, I-25, and I-26 — to intercept the American task force, but none of the submarines made contact with it.

In March 1942, Ro-61 and Ro-62 made their way to Japan, calling at Truk in the Caroline Islands from 9 to 19 March and pausing briefly at Saipan in the Mariana Islands on 22 March before arriving at Sasebo on 30 March 1942. The two submarines departed Sasebo on 31 May 1942, called at Saipan from 6 to 7 June 1942, and arrived at Truk on 10 June 1942. Recalled to Japan, they got underway from Truk on 27 June 1942 bound for Yokosuka, Japan, which they reached on 5 July 1942.

==== Aleutian Islands campaign ====
On 14 July 1942, Submarine Division 26 was reassigned to the 5th Fleet for service in the Aleutian Islands, where the Aleutian Islands campaign had begun in June 1942 with the Japanese occupation of Attu and Kiska. Ro-61 and Ro-62 departed Yokosuka on 24 July 1942 bound for Paramushiro in the northern Kurile Islands, where they arrived on 30 July 1942. They put to sea again on 1 August 1942 to head for Kiska, which they reached on 5 August 1942. Thereafter, they were based there along with the submarines I-6, Ro-63, Ro-64, Ro-65, Ro-67, and Ro-68.

On 7 August 1942, an American task force bombarded Kiska while I-6, Ro-61, Ro-64, and Ro-68 were anchored in the harbor, and they crash-dived to avoid damage. On 8 August 1942, Ro-61 sortied to intercept the American ships, but failed to find them. She returned to Kiska on 10 August 1942. She again put to sea on 11 August 1942 in anticipation of another American raid, but none materialized, and she returned to Kiska on 13 August. She got underway on 15 August 1942 to patrol off Kiska, returning on 17 August 1942 without seeing action.

On 28 August 1942, a Kiska-based Aichi E13A1 (Allied reporting name "Jake") reconnaissance floatplane sighted the U.S. Navy seaplane tender USS Casco (AVP-12) — which the plane's crew mistakenly identified as a light cruiser — and a destroyer in Nazan Bay on the coast of Atka. Ro-61, Ro-62, and Ro-64 got underway from Kiska that day to intercept the ships, and all three of them arrived off Atka on 29 August 1942. Ro-61, at the northern end of the line of submarines, received orders to penetrate Nazan Bay in an attempt to lure the American ships out of the harbor so that the submarines could attack them.

Ro-61 entered Nazan Bay after sundown on 30 August 1942 and approached Casco — which her commanding officer misidentified as a Northampton-class heavy cruiser — so slowly and cautiously that her batteries almost became depleted. She fired three torpedoes from a range of 875 yards (800 m). The first torpedo missed and came to rest on the beach, and the third torpedo also missed. However, the second torpedo struck Casco in her forward engine room, inflicting such severe damage that Casco′s crew beached her to prevent her from sinking. It was the first attack on an enemy ship ever conducted by any Japanese Ro-type submarine.

==== Loss ====
On 31 August 1942, a PBY-5A Catalina flying boat of U.S. Navy Patrol Squadron 42 (VP-42) sighted Ro-61 on the surface in the Bering Sea off the north coast of Atka in the lee of Mount Atka. It attacked Ro-61, strafing her, dropping two depth charges, and inflicting heavy damage. Another PBY, from Patrol Squadron 43 (VP-43), also dropped depth charges. Ro-61 crash-dived, leaving a large oil slick behind on the surface.

The VP-43 PBY directed the nearby destroyer USS Reid (DD-369) to the scene of the attack and marked the oil slick with smoke floats. With Ro-61 operating at a depth of 130 feet (40 m), Reid dropped a pattern of 13 depth charges. Ro-61 dived to 200 feet (61 m) and Reid dropped another pattern of 13 depth charges, which shorted out Ro-61′s central switchboard, started fires in her control room and shell magazine, started multiple leaks in both her diesel engine room and her battery room, and caused her to take on a stern trim. To get her back on an even keel, her crew carried bags of rice and canned food to her bow section. Sea water reached her batteries, creating deadly chlorine gas that began to fill Ro-61′s interior, and chlorine gas poisoning killed one petty officer. Ro-61 suddenly took on a forward trim, and her crew carried 76.2-millimeter (3 in) shells to her aft compartments in an attempt to stabilize her.

The damage Reid′s second attack inflicted ultimately forced Ro-61 to surface. Some members of her crew fired at Reid with Arisaka rifles and others attempted to man her 76.2-millimeter (3 in) deck gun, but Reid swept Ro-61′s deck and conning tower with 20 mm cannon fire that killed or incapacitated most of them. Reid then began scoring hits on Ro-61 with her 5-inch (127 mm)/38 caliber guns. Ro-61 capsized and sank by the stern at 52°36′N 173°57′W with the loss of 60 men. Reid rescued five survivors from the water, and they identified their submarine as Ro-61.

On 1 September 1942, the Imperial Japanese Navy declared Ro-61 to be presumed lost in the Aleutian Islands. The Japanese struck her from the Navy list on 20 October 1942.

== Bibliography ==
- "Rekishi Gunzō"., History of Pacific War Extra, "Perfect guide, The submarines of the Imperial Japanese Forces", Gakken (Japan), March 2005, ISBN 4-05-603890-2
- The Maru Special, Japanese Naval Vessels No.43 Japanese Submarines III, Ushio Shobō (Japan), September 1980, Book code 68343–44
- The Maru Special, Japanese Naval Vessels No.132 Japanese Submarines I "Revised edition", Ushio Shobō (Japan), February 1988, Book code 68344–36
- The Maru Special, Japanese Naval Vessels No.133 Japanese Submarines II "Revised edition", Ushio Shobō (Japan), March 1988, Book code 68344-37
