= Japanese submarine Ro-68 =

History

Japan
- Name: Ro-68
- Builder: Mitsubishi, Kobe, Japan
- Laid down: 6 February 1924
- Launched: 23 February 1925
- Completed: 29 October 1925
- Commissioned: 29 October 1925
- Decommissioned: 10 December 1928
- Recommissioned: 1 November 1929
- Decommissioned: 1 September 1933
- Recommissioned: 1 December 1933
- Decommissioned: 1 July 1937
- Recommissioned: 1 December 1937
- Fate: Surrendered 1945; Stricken 30 November 1945; Scuttled 30 April 1946

General characteristics
- Class & type: Type L4 (Ro-60-class) submarine
- Displacement: 988 long tons (1,004 t) (surfaced); 1,301 tons (1,322 t) (submerged)
- Length: 78.39 m (257 ft 2 in)
- Beam: 7.41 m (24 ft 4 in)
- Draft: 3.96 m (13 ft 0 in)
- Propulsion: 2 × Vickers diesels, 2 shafts 2,400 bhp (surfaced), 1,600 (submerged)
- Speed: 15.7 knots (29.1 km/h) (surfaced); 8.6 knots (15.9 km/h) (submerged)
- Range: 5,500 nautical miles (10,200 km) at 10 knots (19 km/h) (surfaced); 80 nautical miles (150 km) at 5.7 knots (10.6 km/h) (submerged)
- Test depth: 60 m (200 ft)
- Complement: 48
- Armament: 6 × 533 mm torpedo tubes (6 × bow); 12 × 6th Year Type torpedoes; 1 × 76.2 mm (3.00 in) L/40 naval gun; 1 × 6.5 mm machine gun

Ro-68 was an Imperial Japanese Navy Type L submarine of the L4 subclass. First commissioned in 1925, she served in the waters of Japan prior to World War II. During World War II, she supported Japanese forces during the Battle of Wake Island and the invasion of Rabaul and took part in the Aleutian Islands campaign. She served as a training submarine from late 1942 to late 1944 before returning to a combat role in Japanese waters late in the war. She surrendered to the Allies in 1945 at the conclusion of the war and was scuttled in 1946.

== Design and description ==
The submarines of the Type L4 sub-class were copies of the Group 3 subclass of the British L-class submarine built under license in Japan. They were slightly larger and had two more torpedo tubes than the preceding submarines of the L3 subclass. They displaced 1,004 tonnes (988 long tons) surfaced and 1,322 tonnes (1,301 long tons) submerged. The submarines were 78.39 meters (257 ft 2 in) long and had a beam of 7.41 meters (24 ft 4 in) and a draft of 3.96 meters (13 ft 0 in). They had a diving depth of 60 meters (197 ft).

For surface running, the submarines were powered by two 1,200-brake-horsepower (895 kW) Vickers diesel engines, each driving one propeller shaft. When submerged, each propeller was driven by an 800-shaft-horsepower (597 kW) electric motor. They could reach 15.7 knots (29.1 km/h; 18.1 mph) on the surface and 8.6 knots (15.9 km/h; 9.9 mph) underwater. On the surface, they had a range of 5,500 nautical miles (10,200 km; 6,300 mi) at 10 knots (19 km/h; 12 mph); submerged, they had a range of 80 nmi (150 km; 92 mi) at 4 knots (7.4 km/h; 4.6 mph).

The submarines were armed with six internal 533 mm (21 in) torpedo tubes, all in the bow, and carried a total of twelve 6th Year Type torpedoes. They were also armed with a single 76.2 mm (3 in) deck gun and a 6.5 mm machine gun.

== Construction and commissioning ==
Ro-68 was laid down on 6 February 1924 by Mitsubishi at Kobe, Japan. Launched on 23 February 1925, she was completed and commissioned on 29 October 1925.

== Service history ==
=== Pre-World War II ===
Upon commissioning, Ro-68 was attached to the Maizuru Naval District and assigned to Submarine Division 33. On 1 December 1925, she was transferred to Submarine Division 24 in Submarine Squadron 1 in the 1st Fleet in the Combined Fleet. On 1 March 1926, Ro-68 and the submarines Ro-57, Ro-58, Ro-59, Ro-60, Ro-61, Ro-62, Ro-63, and Ro-64 departed Sasebo, Japan, bound for Okinawa, which they reached the same day. The nine submarines got underway from Okinawa on 30 March 1926 for a training cruise in Chinese waters off Shanghai and Amoy which concluded with their arrival at Mako in the Pescadores Islands on 5 April 1926. They departed Mako on 20 April 1926 for the return leg of their training cruise, operating off China near Chusan Island, then returned to Sasebo on 26 April 1926. On 27 March 1927, Ro-60, Ro-61, Ro-62, Ro-63, Ro-64, and Ro-68 departed Saeki Bay, Japan, for a training cruise off Qingdao, China, which they concluded with their arrival at Sasebo, Japan, on 16 May 1927. On 10 December 1928, Ro-68 was decommissioned and placed in reserve at Maizuru, Japan.

On 1 November 1929, Ro-68 was recommissioned and resumed active service in Submarine Division 24 which by that time had been reassigned to the Sasebo Naval District and to the Sasebo Defense Division. Submarine Division 24 returned to duty in Submarine Squadron 1 in the 1st Fleet on 30 November 1929. Ro-68 was removed from Submarine Division 24 and assigned directly to the Sasebo Naval District on 26 June 1930, but returned to the division when it also was reassigned to the Sasebo Naval District on 1 December 1930 Submarine Division 24 began another stint in the Sasebo Defense Division on 1 December 1931. Ro-63 again was decommissioned on 1 September 1933 and placed in reserve.

Ro-68 was recommissioned on 1 December 1933, by which time Submarine Division 24 was assigned to the Sasebo Guard Squadron, in which it remained until 15 November 1934. Thereafter it was subordinate directly to the Sasebo Naval District until 1 December 1936, when it began duty with the Sasebo Defense Squadron. Ro-68 was decommissioned and placed in reserve at Maizuru again on 1 July 1937.

Ro-68 was recommissioned on 1 December 1937, resuming active service in Submarine Division 24 and the Sasebo Guard Squadron in the Sasebo Naval District. On 15 November 1939, she was reassigned to Submarine Division 33 at the submarine school at Kure, Japan. Submarine Division 33 was reassigned to Submarine Squadron 7 in the 4th Fleet in the Combined Fleet on 15 November 1940.

When the Imperial Japanese Navy deployed for the upcoming conflict in the Pacific, Ro-68 was at Kwajalein in the Marshall Islands and serving as flagship of Submarine Division 33. She received the message "Climb Mount Niitaka 1208" (Japanese: Niitakayama nobore 1208) from the Combined Fleet on 2 December 1941, indicating that war with the Allies would commence on 8 December 1941 Japan time, which was on 7 December 1941 on the other side of the International Date Line in Hawaii, where Japanese plans called for the war to open with their attack on Pearl Harbor.

=== World War II ===
==== Central Pacific ====
On 4 December 1941, Ro-68 got underway from Kwajalein in company with Ro-64 with orders patrol off Howland Island and attack any American forces she encountered after the outbreak of war. After the war began, she received orders on 10 December 1941 to proceed to Baker Island and bombard a suspected American flying boat base there. She surfaced off Baker Island during the predawn darkness of 11 December 1941 and shelled the atoll with her 76.2-millimeter (3 in) deck gun from 03:45 to 04:10 Japan Standard Time, targeting the atoll′s Wireless and weather stations. She returned to Kwajalein in company with Ro-64 on 15 December 1941.

Ro-64 got underway from Kwajalein on 24 December 1941 to patrol off Wake Island, which had fallen to Japanese forces on 23 December 1941 in the Battle of Wake Island. She called at Wake from 27 to 29 December 1942 and then patrolled in its vicinity until 1 January 1942, when she again made port at Wake. She departed Wake on 2 January 1942 and called at Truk in the Caroline Islands from 7 to 15 January before getting back underway in company with Ro-63 and Ro-68 to conduct a reconnaissance of Rabaul on New Britain in the Admiralty Islands. She then patrolled south of Cape St. George on New Ireland in support of Japanese forces landing at Rabaul before she returned to Truk on 29 January 1942.

Ro-63, Ro-64, and Ro-68 left Truk on 18 February 1942, called at Ponape from 23 to 24 February, and then set out for the Marshall Islands area. During their voyage, Ro-63′s horizontal rudder failed on 27 February 1942, and Ro-64 accompanied her as she proceeded to Bikini Atoll for jury-rigged repairs. Ro-68 pressed on and arrived at Kwajalein on 11 March 1942. Ro-63 had to abandon her voyage and return to Japan after her temporary repairs failed, but Ro-64 continued on to Kwajalein and joined Ro-68 there on 12 March 1942.

On 16 March 1942, Ro-68 departed Kwajalein in company with Ro-64 to head for Japan, calling along the way at Ponape from 19 to 20 March 1942. Th two submarines then parted company, Ro-64 making for at Truk before proceeding to Japan, while Ro-68 stopped at Saipan in the Mariana Islands from 24 to 26 March 1942 before arriving at Maizuru on 3 April 1942. Ro-63 arrived there the same day, and Ro-64 joined them on 7 April 1942.

Ro-68 departed Maizuru on 5 June 1942, arrived at Saipan on 13 June 1942, and then proceeded to Truk. Recalled to Japan, she got back underway from Truk on 27 June 1942 and arrived at Yokosuka, Japan, on 4 July 1942.

==== Aleutian Islands campaign ====
On 14 July 1942, Submarine Division 33 was reassigned to the 5th Fleet for service in the Aleutian Islands, where the Aleutian Islands campaign had begun in June 1942 with the Japanese occupation of Attu and Kiska. At 16:00 on 24 July 1942, Ro-63, Ro-64, and Ro-68 departed Yokosuka bound for Paramushiro in the northern Kurile Islands, An outbreak of food poisoning among her crew forced Ro-64 to turn back, but Ro-63 and Ro-68 pressed on, reaching Paramushiro on 29 July 1942. They put to sea again on 31 July 1942 to head for Kiska, arriving there on 4 August 1942. Thereafter, they was based there along with the submarines I-6, Ro-61, Ro-62, Ro-65, and Ro-67.

On 7 August 1942, an American task force bombarded Kiska while I-6, Ro-61, Ro-64, and Ro-68 were anchored in the harbor, and they crash-dived to avoid damage. Between 8 and 10 August 1942, Ro-61, Ro-63, Ro-64, and Ro-68 sought to intercept the American ships, but failed to find them. From 11 to 13 August 1942, Ro-68 participated with Ro-63 and Ro-64 in a search for the crew of a ditched reconnaissance plane.

Operating from Kiska, Ro-64 subsequently conducted patrols in the vicinity of the island from 17 to 20 August, 28 to 30 August, 3 to 5 September, and 6 to 11 September 1942. She was anchored at Kiska when aircraft of the United States Army Air Forces Eleventh Air Force attacked the harbor on 14 September 1942. Repeated strafing attacks by P-39 Airacobra fighters disabled both of her periscopes.

Ro-68 conducted her final patrol in Aleutian waters from 22 to 24 September 1942, operating in the North Pacific Ocean south of Kiska. On 25 September 1942, Submarine Division 33 was reassigned to the Kure Naval District. Ro-63, Ro-64, and Ro-68 departed Kiska on 26 September 1942 bound for Maizuru, where they arrived on 5 October 1942.

==== Japanese waters ====
Ro-68 departed Maizuru on 6 November 1942 and arrived at Kure on 8 November 1942. Thereafter, Submarine Division 33 was assigned to training duties in the Kure Naval District, and Ro-68 began service as a training submarine. Submarine Division 33 was assigned to the Kure Submarine Squadron on 1 December 1943.

On 15 August 1944, Ro-68 was reassigned to the Kure Guard Force with Ro-62 and the submarine Ro-500. On 15 May 1945, the three submarines were reassigned to Submarine Division 51 in Submarine Squadron 7 in the Maizuru Naval District.

Ro-68 was at Maizuru when hostilities between Japan and the Allies ended on 15 August 1945. Ro-68 subsequently surrendered to the Allies at Maizuru.

== Disposal ==
The Japanese struck Ro-68 from the Navy list on 30 November 1945. United States Navy forces scuttled her along with Ro-500 and the submarine I-121 in Wakasa Bay off Kanmurijima on 30 April 1946.

== Bibliography ==
- "Rekishi Gunzō"., History of Pacific War Extra, "Perfect guide, The submarines of the Imperial Japanese Forces", Gakken (Japan), March 2005, ISBN 4-05-603890-2
- The Maru Special, Japanese Naval Vessels No.43 Japanese Submarines III, Ushio Shobō (Japan), September 1980, Book code 68343-44
- The Maru Special, Japanese Naval Vessels No.132 Japanese Submarines I "Revised edition", Ushio Shobō (Japan), February 1988, Book code 68344-36
- The Maru Special, Japanese Naval Vessels No.133 Japanese Submarines II "Revised edition", Ushio Shobō (Japan), March 1988, Book code 68344-37
