= Japanese submarine Ro-57 =

History

Japan
- Name: Submarine No. 46
- Builder: Mitsubishi, Kobe, Japan
- Laid down: 20 November 1920
- Launched: 3 December 1921
- Completed: 30 July 1922
- Commissioned: 30 July 1922
- Renamed: Ro-57 on 1 November 1924
- Decommissioned: 1 November 1938
- Recommissioned: 1 April 1939
- Decommissioned: 1 May 1945
- Stricken: 1 May 1945
- Fate: Hulked 1 May 1945; Scrapped 1946

General characteristics
- Class & type: Japanese Type L submarine (L3 subclass)
- Displacement: 903 tonnes (889 long tons) surfaced; 1,120 tonnes (1,102.7 long tons) submerged
- Length: 72.89 m (239 ft 2 in) overall
- Beam: 7.16 m (23 ft 6 in)
- Draft: 3.96 m (13 ft 0 in)
- Installed power: 2,400 bhp (1,800 kW) (diesel); 1,600 shp (1,200 kW) (electric motor)
- Propulsion: Diesel-electric; 2 × Vickers diesel engines, 75 tons fuel; 2 × electric motor; 2 x shafts
- Speed: 17.1 knots (31.7 km/h; 19.7 mph) surfaced; 9.1 knots (16.9 km/h; 10.5 mph) submerged
- Range: 5,500 nmi (10,200 km; 6,300 mi) at 10 knots (19 km/h; 12 mph) surfaced; 80 nmi (150 km; 92 mi) at 4 knots (7.4 km/h; 4.6 mph) submerged
- Test depth: 60 m (197 ft)
- Crew: 46
- Armament: 4 × bow 533 mm (21.0 in) torpedo tubes; 8 x 6th Year Type torpedoes; 1 × 76.2 mm (3 in) gun; 1 x 6.5 mm machine gun

Ro-57, originally named Submarine No. 46, was an Imperial Japanese Navy Type L submarine of the L3 subclass. Except for a few months in 1938, she was in commission from 1922 to 1945. During World War II, she served on second-line duties in Japan.

== Design and description ==
The submarines of the Type L3 sub-class were copies of the Group 2 subclass of the British L-class submarine built under license in Japan. They carried heavier torpedoes than the preceding submarines of the L1 and L2 subclasses. They displaced 903 tonnes (889 long tons) surfaced and 1,120 tonnes (1,102.7 long tons) submerged. The submarines were 72.89 meters (239 ft 2 in) long and had a beam of 7.16 meters (23 ft 6 in) and a draft of 3.96 meters (13 ft 0 in). They had a diving depth of 60 meters (197 ft).

For surface running, the submarines were powered by two 1,200-brake-horsepower (895 kW) Vickers diesel engines, each driving one propeller shaft. When submerged, each propeller was driven by an 800-shaft-horsepower (597 kW) electric motor. They could reach 17.1 knots (31.7 km/h; 19.7 mph) on the surface and 9.1 knots (16.9 km/h; 10.5 mph) underwater. On the surface, they had a range of 5,500 nautical miles (10,200 km; 6,300 mi) at 10 knots (19 km/h; 12 mph); submerged, they had a range of 80 nmi (150 km; 92 mi) at 4 knots (7.4 km/h; 4.6 mph).

The submarines were armed with four internal 533 mm (21 in) torpedo tubes, all in the bow, and carried a total of eight 6th Year Type torpedoes. They were also armed with a single 76.2 mm (3 in) deck gun and a 6.5 mm machine gun.

== Construction and commissioning ==
Ro-57 was laid down as Submarine No. 46 on 20 November 1920 by Mitsubishi at Kobe, Japan. Launched on 3 December 1921, she was completed and commissioned on 30 July 1922, the lead unit of the Type L3 subclass.

== Service history ==
=== Pre-World War II ===
Upon commissioning, Submarine No. 46 was attached to the Yokosuka Naval District. On 1 December 1922, she was assigned to Submarine Division 6 — in which she spent her entire active career — in Submarine Squadron 1 in the 1st Fleet. She was renamed Ro-57 on 1 November 1924. On 1 March 1926, Ro-57 and the submarines Ro-58, Ro-59, Ro-60, Ro-61, Ro-62, Ro-63, Ro-64, and Ro-68 departed Sasebo, Japan, bound for Okinawa, which they reached the same day. The nine submarines got underway from Okinawa on 30 March 1926 for a training cruise in Chinese waters off Shanghai and Amoy which concluded with their arrival at Mako in the Pescadores Islands on 5 April 1926. They departed Mako on 20 April 1926 for the return leg of their training cruise, operating off China near Chusan Island, then returned to Sasebo on 26 April 1926.

Submarine Division 6 was reassigned to Submarine Squadron 2 in the 2nd Fleet on 1 August 1926 and then on 1 December 1926 directly to the Yokosuka Naval District, in which it remained until 1941. In the years that followed, Ro-57 was assigned to the Yokosuka Defense Division from 1 December 1927 to 30 November 1929 and from 1 December 1930 to 11 December 1933, the Yokosuka Guard Squadron from 1 December 1933 to 22 April 1934, then to the Yokosuka Defense Division again from 22 April to 15 June 1934, followed by another stint in the Yokosuka Guard Squadron from 15 June to 15 November 1934. On 1 November 1938, she was decommissioned and placed in Second Reserve in the Yokosuka Naval District.

Ro-57 was recommissioned on 1 April 1939 and assigned that day to duty at the gunnery school in the Yokosuka Naval District. She participated in a naval review at Yokohama on 11 October 1940. Her gunnery school duty concluded on 1 November 1941, when she was reassigned to the Kure Naval District.

=== World War II ===
The Pacific Campaign of World War II began on 7 December 1941 (8 December 1941 in East Asia) with the Japanese attack on Pearl Harbor, Hawaii. Ro-57 served on training duties in Japanese waters from 1941, operating in the Kure Defense Force until 15 January 1943, when Submarine Division 6 was transferred back to the Yokosuka Naval District.

Ro-57 was decommissioned, stricken from the Navy list, and placed in the Fourth Reserve in the Yokosuka Naval District on 15 May 1945. She then served at Shōdoshima as a stationary training hulk for the crews of midget submarines until 15 August 1945, when hostilities between Japan and the Allies ended. She was scrapped in 1946.

== Bibliography ==
- "Rekishi Gunzō"., History of Pacific War Extra, "Perfect guide, The submarines of the Imperial Japanese Forces", Gakken (Japan), March 2005, ISBN 4-05-603890-2
- The Maru Special, Japanese Naval Vessels No.43 Japanese Submarines III, Ushio Shobō (Japan), September 1980, Book code 68343-44
- The Maru Special, Japanese Naval Vessels No.132 Japanese Submarines I "Revised edition", Ushio Shobō (Japan), February 1988, Book code 68344-36
- The Maru Special, Japanese Naval Vessels No.133 Japanese Submarines II "Revised edition", Ushio Shobō (Japan), March 1988, Book code 68344-37
