= Japanese submarine Ro-64 =

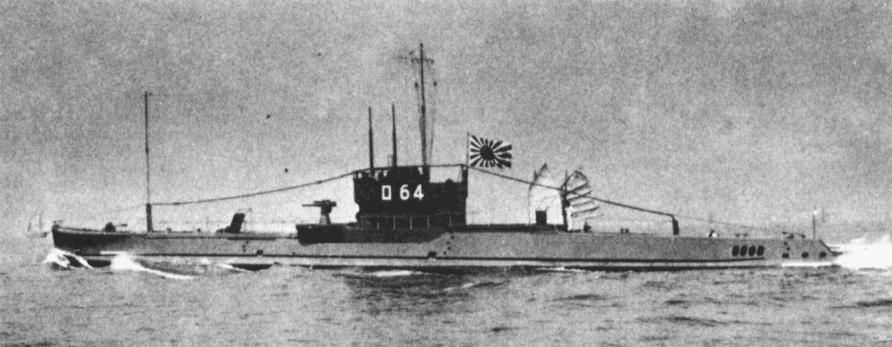
- RO-64 in 1945

History

Japan
- Name: Submarine No. 79
- Builder: Mitsubishi, Kobe, Japan
- Laid down: 15 October 1923
- Launched: 19 August 1924
- Renamed: Ro-64 on 1 November 1924
- Completed: 30 April 1925
- Commissioned: 30 April 1925
- Decommissioned: 10 December 1928
- Recommissioned: 1 December 1929
- Decommissioned: 1 December 1932
- Recommissioned: 25 March 1933
- Decommissioned: 1 December 1936 (possibly — see text)
- Recommissioned: 1 May 1939 (possibly — see text)
- Decommissioned: 20 March 1940
- Recommissioned: 26 July 1940
- Fate: Sunk 12 April 1945
- Stricken: 10 August 1945

General characteristics
- Class & type: Type L4 (Ro-60-class)
- Displacement: 988 long tons (1,004 t) (surfaced); 1,301 tons (1,322 t) (submerged)
- Length: 78.39 m (257.2 ft)
- Beam: 7.41 m (24.3 ft)
- Draft: 3.96 m (13.0 ft)
- Propulsion: 2 × Vickers diesels, 2 shafts 2,400 bhp (surfaced), 1,600 (submerged)
- Speed: 15.7 knots (29.1 km/h) (surfaced); 8.6 knots (15.9 km/h) (submerged)
- Range: 5,500 nautical miles (10,200 km) at 10 knots (19 km/h) (surfaced); 80 nautical miles (150 km) at 5.7 knots (10.6 km/h) (submerged)
- Test depth: 60 m (200 ft)
- Complement: 48
- Armament: 6 × 533 mm torpedo tubes (6 × bow); 12 × 6th Year Type torpedoes; 1 × 76.2 mm (3.00 in) L/40 naval gun; 1 × 6.5 mm machine gun

Ro-64, originally named Submarine No. 79, was an Imperial Japanese Navy Type L submarine of the L4 subclass. First commissioned in 1925, she served in the waters of Japan and Chōsen prior to World War II. During World War II, she operated in the Central Pacific, supported the Japanese invasion of Rabaul, and took part in the Aleutian Islands campaign, then in late 1942 was relegated to a role as a training ship. She was sunk in April 1945.

== Design and description ==
The submarines of the Type L4 sub-class were copies of the Group 3 subclass of the British L-class submarine built under license in Japan. They were slightly larger and had two more torpedo tubes than the preceding submarines of the L3 subclass. They displaced 1,004 tonnes (988 long tons) surfaced and 1,322 tonnes (1,301 long tons) submerged. The submarines were 78.39 meters (257 ft 2 in) long and had a beam of 7.41 meters (24 ft 4 in) and a draft of 3.96 meters (13 ft 0 in). They had a diving depth of 60 meters (197 ft).

For surface running, the submarines were powered by two 1,200-brake-horsepower (895 kW) Vickers diesel engines, each driving one propeller shaft. When submerged, each propeller was driven by an 800-shaft-horsepower (597 kW) electric motor. They could reach 15.7 knots (29.1 km/h; 18.1 mph) on the surface and 8.6 knots (15.9 km/h; 9.9 mph) underwater. On the surface, they had a range of 5,500 nautical miles (10,200 km; 6,300 mi) at 10 knots (19 km/h; 12 mph); submerged, they had a range of 80 nmi (150 km; 92 mi) at 4 knots (7.4 km/h; 4.6 mph).

The submarines were armed with six internal 533 mm (21 in) torpedo tubes, all in the bow, and carried a total of twelve 6th Year Type torpedoes. They were also armed with a single 76.2 mm (3 in) deck gun and a 6.5 mm machine gun.

== Construction and commissioning ==
Ro-64 was laid down as Submarine No. 79 on 15 October 1923 by Mitsubishi at Kobe, Japan. Launched on 19 August 1924, She was renamed Ro-64 on 1 November 1924 while fitting out. She was completed and commissioned on 30 April 1925.

== Service history ==
=== Pre-World War II ===
Upon commissioning, Ro-64 was attached to the Maizuru Naval District and assigned to Submarine Division 33. On 1 June 1925, she was transferred to the Sasebo Naval District and reassigned to Submarine Division 24, in which she remained until 1939. Submarine Division 24 was reassigned to Submarine Squadron 1 in the 1st Fleet in the Combined Fleet on 1 December 1925. On 1 March 1926, Ro-64 and the submarines Ro-57, Ro-58, Ro-59, Ro-60, Ro-61, Ro-62, Ro-63, and Ro-68 departed Sasebo, Japan, bound for Okinawa, which they reached the same day. The nine submarines got underway from Okinawa on 30 March 1926 for a training cruise in Chinese waters off Shanghai and Amoy which concluded with their arrival at Mako in the Pescadores Islands on 5 April 1926. They departed Mako on 20 April 1926 for the return leg of their training cruise, operating off China near Chusan Island, then returned to Sasebo on 26 April 1926. On 27 March 1927, Ro-60, Ro-61, Ro-62, Ro-63, Ro-64, and Ro-68 departed Saeki Bay, Japan, for a training cruise off Qingdao, China, which they concluded with their arrival at Sasebo, Japan, on 16 May 1927.

On 10 December 1928, Submarine Division 24 was transferred back to the Sasebo Naval District and began service in the Sasebo Defense Division, and Ro-64 was decommissioned that day and placed in reserve. On 30 November 1929, Submarine Division 24 returned to duty in Submarine Squadron 1 in the 1st Fleet, and on 1 December 1929 Ro-64 was recommissioned and returned to service in the division. Submarine Division 24 transferred back to the Sasebo Naval District on 1 December 1930 and began a stint in the Sasebo Defense Division on 1 December 1931. Ro-64 again was decommissioned on 1 December 1932 and placed in reserve.

Ro-64 was recommissioned on 25 March 1933, resuming active service in Submarine Division 24 and in the Sasebo Guard Squadron in the Sasebo Naval District. The division′s service in the Sasebo Guard Squadron ended on 15 November 1934, after which it was assigned directly to the Sasebo Naval District until 1 December 1936, when it was assigned to the Sasebo Defense Squadron. Sources differ on Ro-64′s status between 1 December 1936 and 1 May 1939, both implying that she remained active during that time and stating that she was out of commission in the Sasebo Naval District in Fourth Reserve from 1 December 1936 to 1 March 1939 and then in Second Reserve until 1 May 1939. She helped Royal Thai Navy submarine crews perform dive training sometime after September 1937.

On 1 May 1939, Ro-64 was assigned to the Chinkai Defense Division on the south coast of Chōsen. She returned to Submarine Division 24 and the Sasebo Naval District on 1 July 1939. On 15 November 1939, she was reassigned to Submarine Division 33 in the Kure Naval District for service at the submarine school at Kure, Japan. She was decommissioned on 20 March 1940, but returned to commission on 26 July 1940 and resumed service in Submarine Division 33 at the submarine school.

On 15 November 1939, Submarine Division 33 was reassigned to Submarine Squadron 7 in the 4th Fleet in the Combined Fleet. When the Imperial Japanese Navy deployed for the upcoming conflict in the Pacific, Ro-64 was at Kwajalein in the Marshall Islands with the other submarines of Submarine Division 33, Ro-63 and Ro-68. She received the message "Climb Mount Niitaka 1208" (Japanese: Niitakayama nobore 1208) from the Combined Fleet on 2 December 1941, indicating that war with the Allies would commence on 8 December 1941 Japan time, which was on 7 December 1941 on the other side of the International Date Line in Hawaii, where Japanese plans called for the war to open with their attack on Pearl Harbor.

=== World War II ===
==== Central Pacific ====
At 16:00 on 4 December 1941, Ro-64 got underway from Kwajalein in company with Ro-68 with orders to conduct a reconnaissance of the Phoenix Islands, patrol off Howland Island, and attack any American forces they encountered after the war began. On 5 December 1941, she paused to reconnoiter Majuro in the Marshall Islands before proceeding to the Phoenix Islands, which she reached on 7 December. She arrived at Howland Island on 8 December and began a periscope reconnaissance of it. With the war underway, the Imperial Japanese Navy Air Service raided Howland that day, and on 10 December 1941 Ro-64 received orders to destroy whatever facilities on Howland had survived the air attack.

After sunset on 10 December 1941, Ro-64 approached Howland Island. Her commanding officer initially intended to send a landing party ashore to destroy the surviving facilities, but decided against the landing at 22:40 Japan Standard Time (JST) out of a concern that defenders ashore had sighted Ro-64 and because of a relatively high sea state. He decided instead to shell Howland with Ro-64′s 76.2-millimeter (3 in) deck gun, and at 02:00 JST on 11 December 1941 Ro-64 began her bombardment, firing at the island′s Wireless and weather station, barracks, and lighthouse. She departed the Howland area at 03:00 JST to rendezvous with Ro-68 off Baker Island, which Ro-68 had bombarded. Between 15:00 and 15:20 JST on 11 December, Ro-64 also bombarded Baker Island. She returned to Kwajalein in company with Ro-68 on 15 December 1941.

Ro-64 got underway from Kwajalein on 24 December 1941 to patrol off Wake Island, which had fallen to Japanese forces on 23 December 1941 in the Battle of Wake Island. She arrived off Wake on 27 December and then patrolled east of the atoll from 28 to 30 December 1941, when she made port at Wake. She departed Wake on 1 January 1942 and called at Truk in the Caroline Islands from 6 to 15 January before getting back underway in company with Ro-63 and Ro-68 to conduct a reconnaissance of Rabaul on New Britain in the Admiralty Islands. She then patrolled south of Cape St. George on New Ireland in support of Japanese forces landing at Rabaul before she returned to Truk on 29 January 1942.

Ro-63, Ro-64, and Ro-68 left Truk on 18 February 1942, called at Ponape from 23 to 24 February, and then set out for the Marshall Islands area. During their voyage, however, Ro-63′s horizontal rudder failed on 27 February 1942, and Ro-64 accompanied her as she proceeded to Bikini Atoll for repairs. The two submarines arrived at Bikini on 28 February 1942 and got back underway on 1 March, but Ro-63′s jury-rigged rudder quickly broke again, forcing her to turn back to Bikini while Ro-64 proceeded independently. Ro-64 arrived at Kwajalein on 12 March 1942.

On 16 March 1942, Ro-64 departed Kwajalein to head for Japan, calling along the way at Ponape from 19 to 20 March 1942, at Truk from 21 to 27 March 1942, and at Saipan in the Mariana Islands from 29 to 30 March 1942 before arriving at Maizuru, Japan, on 7 April 1942.

==== Aleutian Islands campaign ====
On 14 July 1942, Submarine Division 33 was reassigned to the 5th Fleet for service in the Aleutian Islands, where the Aleutian Islands campaign had begun in June 1942 with the Japanese occupation of Attu and Kiska. At 16:00 on 24 July 1942, Ro-63, Ro-64, and Ro-68 departed Yokosuka, Japan, bound for Paramushiro in the northern Kurile Islands, but an outbreak of food poisoning among her crew forced Ro-64 to turn back. She arrived at Yokosuka on 26 July 1942, and on 27 July again departed for Paramushiro, which she reached on 1 August 1942. She put to sea again on 2 August 1942 to head for Kiska, arriving there on 6 August 1942. Thereafter, she was based there along with the submarines I-6, Ro-61, Ro-62, Ro-63, Ro-65, Ro-67, and Ro-68.

On 7 August 1942, an American task force bombarded Kiska while I-6, Ro-61, Ro-64, and Ro-68 were anchored in the harbor, and they crash-dived to avoid damage. Between 8 and 10 August 1942, Ro-61, Ro-63, Ro-64, and Ro-68 sought to intercept the American ships, but failed to find them. From 11 to 13 August 1942, Ro-64 participated with Ro-63 and Ro-68 in a search for the crew of a ditched reconnaissance plane, and Ro-64 subsequently conducted a patrol off the Aleutians, departing Kiska on 17 August 1942 and returning on 26 August 1942.

On 28 August 1942, a Kiska-based Aichi E13A1 (Allied reporting name "Jake") reconnaissance floatplane sighted the U.S. Navy seaplane tender USS Casco (AVP-12) — which the plane′s crew mistakenly identified as a light cruiser — and a destroyer in Nazan Bay on the coast of Atka. Ro-61, Ro-62, and Ro-64 got underway from Kiska that day to intercept the ships, and all three of them arrived off Atka on 29 August 1942. Ro-64 made no contact with enemy forces and returned to Kiska on 4 September 1942.

Ro-64 conducted another patrol off the Aleutians from 5 to 17 September 1942, and while she was at sea Submarine Division 33 was attached directly to the 51st Base Unit at Kiska on 15 September 1942. While Ro-64 was at Kiska on 25 September 1942, Submarine Division 33 was reassigned to the Kure Naval District. Ro-63, Ro-64, and Ro-68 departed Kiska on 26 September 1942 bound for Maizuru, where they arrived on 5 October 1942.

==== Training duties ====
Ro-64 departed Maizuru on 6 October 1942 and arrived at Kure on 8 October 1942. Thereafter, Submarine Division 33 was assigned to training duties in the Kure Naval District, and Ro-64 spent the rest of her career as a training submarine. Submarine Division 33 was assigned to the Kure Submarine Squadron on 1 December 1943.

==== Loss ====
At 14:28 JST on 12 April 1945, Ro-64 was submerged in Hiroshima Bay during a training cruise when she detonated a magnetic mine laid by an American aircraft. She sank quickly at 34°14′N 132°16′E with the loss of all 81 men on board — her crew of 50, the embarked commander of Submarine Division 33, and 30 trainees. The Japanese struck her from the Navy list on 10 August 1945.

== Bibliography ==
- "Rekishi Gunzō"., History of Pacific War Extra, "Perfect guide, The submarines of the Imperial Japanese Forces", Gakken (Japan), March 2005, ISBN 4-05-603890-2
- The Maru Special, Japanese Naval Vessels No.43 Japanese Submarines III, Ushio Shobō (Japan), September 1980, Book code 68343-44
- The Maru Special, Japanese Naval Vessels No.132 Japanese Submarines I "Revised edition", Ushio Shobō (Japan), February 1988, Book code 68344-36
- The Maru Special, Japanese Naval Vessels No.133 Japanese Submarines II "Revised edition", Ushio Shobō (Japan), March 1988, Book code 68344-37
