= Japanese submarine Ro-60 =

History

Japan
- Name: Submarine No. 59
- Builder: Mitsubishi, Kobe, Japan
- Laid down: 5 December 1921
- Launched: 22 December 1922
- Completed: 17 September 1923
- Commissioned: 17 September 1923
- Renamed: Ro-60 on 1 November 1924
- Decommissioned: 10 February 1928
- Recommissioned: 20 September 1928
- Decommissioned: 1 June 1934
- Recommissioned: 15 October 1940
- Fate: Wrecked 29 December 1941
- Stricken: 15 February 1942

General characteristics
- Class & type: Type L4 (Ro-60-class) submarine
- Displacement: 988 long tons (1,004 t) (surfaced); 1,301 tons (1,322 t) (submerged)
- Length: 78.39 m (257 ft 2 in)
- Beam: 7.41 m (24 ft 4 in)
- Draft: 3.96 m (13 ft 0 in)
- Propulsion: 2 × Vickers diesels, 2 shafts 2,400 bhp (1,790 kW) (surfaced), 1,600 shp (1,193 kW) (submerged), 75 tons fuel
- Speed: 15.7 knots (29.1 km/h) (surfaced); 8.6 knots (15.9 km/h) (submerged)
- Range: 5,500 nautical miles (10,200 km) at 10 knots (19 km/h) (surfaced); 80 nautical miles (150 km) at 5.7 knots (10.6 km/h) (submerged)
- Test depth: 60 m (200 ft)
- Complement: 48
- Armament: 6 × 533 mm torpedo tubes (6 × bow); 12 × 6th Year Type torpedoes; 1 × 76.2 mm (3.00 in) L/40 naval gun; 1 × 6.5 mm machine gun

Ro-60, originally named Submarine No. 59, was an Imperial Japanese Navy Type L submarine of the L4 subclass. She was in commission from 1923 to 1934 and from 1940 to 1941. Before World War II, she served in the waters of Japan. During World War II, she took part in the Battle of Wake Island in December 1941, and was damaged by an F4F-3 Wildcat during that battle. The submarine wrecked three weeks later trying to make it back to base, running aground on a reef and was abandoned. All the crew were rescued by a Japanese vessel. Later in the war the vessel exploded after being strafed, scattering fragments of the vessel on that reef.

== Design and description ==
The submarines of the Type L4 subclass were copies of the Group 3 subclass of the British L-class submarine built under license in Japan. They were slightly larger and had two more torpedo tubes than the preceding submarines of the L3 subclass. They displaced 1,004 tonnes (988 long tons) surfaced and 1,322 tonnes (1,301 long tons) submerged. The submarines were 78.39 meters (257 ft 2 in) long and had a beam of 7.41 meters (24 ft 4 in) and a draft of 3.96 meters (13 ft 0 in). They had a diving depth of 60 meters (197 ft).

For surface running, the submarines were powered by two 1,200-brake-horsepower (895 kW) Vickers diesel engines, each driving one propeller shaft. When submerged, each propeller was driven by an 800-shaft-horsepower (597 kW) electric motor. They could reach 15.7 knots (29.1 km/h; 18.1 mph) on the surface and 8.6 knots (15.9 km/h; 9.9 mph) underwater. On the surface, they had a range of 5,500 nautical miles (10,200 km; 6,300 mi) at 10 knots (19 km/h; 12 mph); submerged, they had a range of 80 nmi (150 km; 92 mi) at 4 knots (7.4 km/h; 4.6 mph).

The submarines were armed with six internal 533 mm (21 in) torpedo tubes, all in the bow, and carried a total of twelve 6th Year Type torpedoes. They were also armed with a single 76.2 mm (3 in) deck gun and a 6.5 mm machine gun.

== Construction and commissioning ==
Ro-60 was laid down as Submarine No. 59 on 5 December 1921 by Mitsubishi at Kobe, Japan. Launched on 22 December 1922, she was completed and commissioned on 17 September 1923.

== Service history ==
=== Pre-World War II ===
Upon commissioning, Submarine No. 59 was assigned to the Sasebo Naval District. On 9 February 1924, she was reassigned to Submarine Division 26 — in which she spent the remainder of her career — and to the Sasebo Defense Division. On 1 April 1924, Submarine Division 26 was reassigned to Submarine Squadron 1 in the 1st Fleet. Submarine No. 59 was renamed Ro-60 on 1 November 1924.

On 1 December 1925, Submarine Division 26 was reassigned to Submarine Squadron 2 in the 2nd Fleet in the Combined Fleet. On 1 March 1926, Ro-60 and the submarines Ro-57, Ro-58, Ro-59, Ro-61, Ro-62, Ro-63, Ro-64, and Ro-68 departed Sasebo, Japan, bound for Okinawa, which they reached the same day. The nine submarines got underway from Okinawa on 30 March 1926 for a training cruise in Chinese waters off Shanghai and Amoy which concluded with their arrival at Mako in the Pescadores Islands on 5 April 1926. They departed Mako on 20 April 1926 for the return leg of their training cruise, operating off China near Chusan Island, then returned to Sasebo on 26 April 1926.

On 15 December 1926, the Submarine Division 26 returned to the Sasebo Naval District and the Sasebo Defense Division. On 27 March 1927, Ro-60, Ro-61, Ro-62, Ro-63, Ro-64, and Ro-68 departed Saeki Bay, Japan, for a training cruise off Qingdao, China, which they concluded with her arrival at Sasebo, Japan, on 16 May 1927. Ro-60 was decommissioned on 10 February 1928 and placed in Third Reserve at Sasebo.

Ro-60 was recommissioned on 20 September 1928 and resumed active service in Submarine Division 26 in the Sasebo Defense Division in the Sasebo Naval District. On 10 December 1928, the division again was assigned to Submarine Squadron 1 in the 1st Fleet. On 1 December 1930, it returned to the Sasebo Naval District, and served in the Sasebo Defense Division again from that date until 15 November 1933. On 1 June 1934, Ro-60 was decommissioned and placed in Second Reserve at Sasebo, and while in Second Reserve was assigned to the Sasebo Guard Squadron from 15 November 1934 to 15 November 1935. She moved to Third Reserve on 15 December 1938 and to Fourth Reserve on 15 November 1939.

Ro-60 again was recommissioned on 15 October 1940, and on 15 November 1940 Submarine Division 26 was reassigned to Submarine Squadron 7 in the 4th Fleet in the Combined Fleet. When the Imperial Japanese Navy deployed for the upcoming conflict in the Pacific, Ro-60 was at Kwajalein in the Marshall Islands. She received the message "Climb Mount Niitaka 1208" (Japanese: Niitakayama nobore 1208) from the Combined Fleet on 2 December 1941, indicating that war with the Allies would commence on 8 December 1941 Japan time, which was on 7 December 1941 on the other side of the International Date Line in Hawaii, where Japanese plans called for the war to open with their attack on Pearl Harbor.

=== World War II ===
==== Battle of Wake Island ====
Ro-60 was with the other submarines of Submarine Division 26 — Ro-61 and Ro-62 — at Kwajalein when Japan entered World War II on 8 December 1941, Kwajalein time. The three submarines were placed on "standby alert" that day as United States Marine Corps forces on Wake Island threw back the first Japanese attempt to invade the atoll. On 12 December 1941, Ro-60 and Ro-61 got underway from Kwajalein to support a second, heavily reinforced Japanese attempt to invade Wake Island; Ro-62 followed on 14 December 1941.

Ro-60 was on the surface 25 nautical miles (46 km; 29 mi) southwest of Wake at around 16:00 local time on 21 December 1941 when a U.S. Marine Corps F4F Wildcat fighter of Marine Fighter Squadron 211 (VMF-211) attacked her, strafing her and dropping two 100-pound (45.4 kg) bombs. Ro-60 crash-dived, but the attack damaged her periscopes and several of her diving tanks. After she resurfaced that night and her crew inspected her damage, her commanding officer decided that she no longer could dive safely. The Battle of Wake Island ended as Wake Island fell to the Japanese on 23 December 1941, and that day Ro-60 and Ro-62 received orders to return to Kwajalein.

==== Loss ====
As she was approaching Kwajalein Atoll in bad weather in the predawn darkness of 29 December 1941, Ro-60 went off course and ran hard aground on a reef north of the atoll at 02:00 at 09°00′N 167°30′E, damaging her pressure hull and splitting her starboard diving tanks open. At about 13:00, the commander of Submarine Squadron 7 arrived on the scene from Kwajalein aboard his flagship, the submarine tender Jingei, to supervise rescue and salvage operations personally. Pounded by high surf, Ro-60 incurred additional damage and took on such a heavy list that her crew destroyed her secret documents and abandoned ship. Jingei rescued all 66 members of her crew.

The Japanese struck Ro-60 from the Navy list on 15 February 1942. At some point later in World War II, an unidentified aircraft strafed her wreck, detonating Ro-60′s torpedoes and blowing the wreck apart. Divers who later visited the site found her wreckage strewn all over the reef, with her aft section lying against the reef, her forward section lying 200 yards (180 m) ahead of her stern, her conning tower 150 yards (140 m) from the forward section, and her deck gun 560 yards (510 m) beyond that.

== Bibliography ==
- "Rekishi Gunzō"., History of Pacific War Extra, "Perfect guide, The submarines of the Imperial Japanese Forces", Gakken (Japan), March 2005, ISBN 4-05-603890-2
- The Maru Special, Japanese Naval Vessels No.43 Japanese Submarines III, Ushio Shobō (Japan), September 1980, Book code 68343-44
- The Maru Special, Japanese Naval Vessels No.132 Japanese Submarines I "Revised edition", Ushio Shobō (Japan), February 1988, Book code 68344-36
- The Maru Special, Japanese Naval Vessels No.133 Japanese Submarines II "Revised edition", Ushio Shobō (Japan), March 1988, Book code 68344-37
