= SS Samuel Heintzelman =

World War II Liberty ship of the United States

- A Liberty ship at sea

History

United States
- Name: Samuel Heintzelman
- Namesake: Samuel Heintzelman
- Builder: California Shipbuilding Corporation, Terminal Island, Los Angeles
- Yard number: 134
- Laid down: 27 August 1942
- Launched: 30 September 1942
- Fate: Sunk on 9 July 1943 by U-511

General characteristics
- Class & type: Type EC2-S-C1 Liberty ship
- Displacement: 14,245 long tons (14,474 t)
- Length: 441 ft 6 in (134.57 m) o/a; 417 ft 9 in (127.33 m) p/p; 427 ft (130 m) w/l
- Beam: 57 ft (17 m)
- Draft: 27 ft 9 in (8.46 m)
- Propulsion: Two oil-fired boilers; Triple-expansion steam engine; 2,500 hp (1,900 kW); Single screw
- Speed: 11 knots (20 km/h; 13 mph)
- Range: 20,000 nmi (37,000 km; 23,000 mi)
- Capacity: 10,856 t (10,685 long tons) deadweight (DWT)
- Complement: 42 merchants and 27 US Armed Guards
- Crew: 81
- Armament: Stern-mounted 4 in (100 mm) deck gun; Variety of anti-aircraft guns

SS Samuel Heintzelman (MC hull number 651) was a Liberty ship built in the United States during World War II. Named after Samuel Heintzelman, a United States Army general, the ship was laid down by the California Shipbuilding Corporation at Terminal Island in Los Angeles, and launched on 27 August 1942. It was operated by Coastwise Line.

Samuel Heintzelman was en route from Fremantle, Australia, to Colombo, Ceylon without a convoy, carrying 5,644 tons of ammunition. On 9 July 1943, the ship was torpedoed by a German submarine U-511, causing it to explode and sink. The entire crew of 42 merchant sailors, 27 US Navy Armed Guard members, and six passengers were lost. The ship sank near the Maldives in the Indian Ocean, at 9°S 81°E. It had been scheduled to arrive in Colombo, Sri Lanka on 14 July 1943, before continuing to Karachi, Pakistan and Calcutta, India.

All the missing crew were declared dead on January 7, 1946. Later, Heinz Rehse, a crew member of U-511, reported the date and location of the sinking of the SS Samuel Heintzelman. On September 30, 1943, wreckage from Samuel Heintzelman washed ashore on Diego Garcia Island, an atoll just south of the equator in the central Indian Ocean.

== See also ==
- List of Liberty ships (S–Z)
- SS E. A. Bryan
- SS Quinault Victory
- Port Chicago disaster
