= Japanese submarine Ro-62 =

1923 Ro-60-class submarine

History

Japan
- Name: Submarine No. 73
- Builder: Mitsubishi, Kobe, Japan
- Laid down: 8 September 1922
- Launched: 19 September 1923
- Completed: 24 July 1924
- Commissioned: 24 July 1924
- Renamed: Ro-62 on 1 November 1924
- Decommissioned: 10 July 1928
- Recommissioned: 30 November 1929
- Decommissioned: 14 November 1931
- Recommissioned: 24 September 1932
- Decommissioned: 15 November 1934
- Recommissioned: 15 December 1938
- Fate: Surrendered September 1945; Stricken 20 November 1945; Scuttled May 1946

General characteristics
- Class & type: Type L4 (Ro-60-class) submarine
- Displacement: 988 long tons (1,004 t) (surfaced); 1,301 tons (1,322 t) (submerged)
- Length: 78.39 m (257 ft 2 in)
- Beam: 7.41 m (24 ft 4 in)
- Draft: 3.96 m (13 ft 0 in)
- Propulsion: 2 × Vickers diesels, 2 shafts 2,400 bhp (surfaced), 1,600 (submerged)
- Speed: 15.7 knots (29.1 km/h) (surfaced); 8.6 knots (15.9 km/h) (submerged)
- Range: 5,500 nautical miles (10,200 km) at 10 knots (19 km/h) (surfaced); 80 nautical miles (150 km) at 5.7 knots (10.6 km/h) (submerged)
- Test depth: 60 m (200 ft)
- Complement: 48
- Armament: 6 × 533 mm torpedo tubes (6 × bow); 12 × 6th Year Type torpedoes; 1 × 76.2 mm (3.00 in) L/40 naval gun; 1 × 6.5 mm machine gun

Ro-62, originally named Submarine No. 73, was an Imperial Japanese Navy Type L submarine of the L4 subclass. She was in commission at various times from 1923 to 1934, and was recommissioned in 1938. Before World War II, she served in the waters of Japan. During World War II, she took part in the Battle of Wake Island and the Aleutian Islands campaign, then was relegated to a training role in late 1942. After the war ended in 1945, she surrendered to the Allies. She was scuttled in 1946.

== Design and description ==
The submarines of the Type L4 sub-class were copies of the Group 3 subclass of the British L-class submarine built under license in Japan. They were slightly larger and had two more torpedo tubes than the preceding submarines of the L3 subclass. They displaced 1,004 tonnes (988 long tons) surfaced and 1,322 tonnes (1,301 long tons) submerged. The submarines were 78.39 meters (257 ft 2 in) long and had a beam of 7.41 meters (24 ft 4 in) and a draft of 3.96 meters (13 ft 0 in). They had a diving depth of 60 meters (197 ft).

For surface running, the submarines were powered by two 1,200-brake-horsepower (895 kW) Vickers diesel engines, each driving one propeller shaft. When submerged, each propeller was driven by an 800-shaft-horsepower (597 kW) electric motor. They could reach 15.7 knots (29.1 km/h; 18.1 mph) on the surface and 8.6 knots (15.9 km/h; 9.9 mph) underwater. On the surface, they had a range of 5,500 nautical miles (10,200 km; 6,300 mi) at 10 knots (19 km/h; 12 mph); submerged, they had a range of 80 nmi (150 km; 92 mi) at 4 knots (7.4 km/h; 4.6 mph).

The submarines were armed with six internal 533 mm (21 in) torpedo tubes, all in the bow, and carried a total of twelve 6th Year Type torpedoes. They were also armed with a single 76.2 mm (3 in) deck gun and a 6.5 mm machine gun.

== Construction and commissioning ==
Ro-62 was laid down as Submarine No. 73 on 8 September 1922 by Mitsubishi at Kobe, Japan. Launched on 19 September 1923, she was completed and commissioned on 24 July 1924.

== Service history ==
=== Pre-World War II ===
Upon commissioning, Submarine No. 73 was attached to the Maizuru Naval District and assigned to Submarine Division 33 and to the Sasebo Defense Division. On 1 September 1924, she was reassigned to Submarine Division 26 in Submarine Squadron 1 in the 1st Fleet. She was renamed Ro-62 on 1 November 1924.

On 1 December 1925, Submarine Division 26 was reassigned to Submarine Squadron 2 in the 2nd Fleet in the Combined Fleet. On 1 March 1926, Ro-61 and the submarines Ro-57, Ro-58, Ro-59, Ro-60, Ro-61, Ro-63, Ro-64, and Ro-68 departed Sasebo, Japan, bound for Okinawa, which they reached the same day. The nine submarines got underway from Okinawa on 30 March 1926 for a training cruise in Chinese waters off Shanghai and Amoy which concluded with their arrival at Mako in the Pescadores Islands on 5 April 1926. They departed Mako on 20 April 1926 for the return leg of their training cruise, operating off China near Chusan Island, then returned to Sasebo on 26 April 1926.

On 15 December 1926, Submarine Division 26 returned to the Sasebo Naval District and the Sasebo Defense Division. On 27 March 1927, Ro-60, Ro-61, Ro-62, Ro-63, Ro-64, and Ro-68 departed Saeki Bay, Japan, for a training cruise off Qingdao, China, which they concluded with their arrival at Sasebo, Japan, on 16 May 1927. On 10 July 1928, Ro-62 was decommissioned and placed in reserve.

Ro-62 was recommissioned on 30 November 1929 and returned to duty with Submarine Division 26, which by then was assigned to Submarine Squadron 1 in the 1st Fleet. She again was decommissioned on 14 November 1931 and placed in reserve.

Ro-62 was recommissioned on 24 September 1932, resuming active service in Submarine Division 26, which by then was assigned to the Sasebo Defense Division in the Sasebo Naval District. The division's service in the Sasebo Defense Division ended on 15 November 1933, and Ro-62 again was decommissioned on 15 November 1934 and placed in reserve. Recommissioned on 15 December 1938, she returned to duty in Submarine Division 26 in the Sasebo Naval District. On 15 November 1939, Submarine Division 26 was reassigned to Submarine Squadron 7 in the 4th Fleet in the Combined Fleet. When the Imperial Japanese Navy deployed for the upcoming conflict in the Pacific, Ro-62 was at Kwajalein in the Marshall Islands. She received the message "Climb Mount Niitaka 1208" (Japanese: Niitakayama nobore 1208) from the Combined Fleet on 2 December 1941, indicating that war with the Allies would commence on 8 December 1941 Japan time, which was on 7 December 1941 on the other side of the International Date Line in Hawaii, where Japanese plans called for the war to open with their attack on Pearl Harbor.

=== World War II ===
==== Central Pacific ====
Ro-62 was with the other submarines of Submarine Division 26 — Ro-60 and Ro-61 — at Kwajalein when Japan entered World War II on 8 December 1941, Kwajalein time. The three submarines were placed on "standby alert" that day as United States Marine Corps forces on Wake Island threw back the first Japanese attempt to invade the atoll.

On 12 December 1941, Ro-60, Ro-61, and Ro-62 were assigned to support a second, heavily reinforced Japanese attempt to invade Wake Island, and Ro-60 and Ro-61 got underway from Kwajalein for the Wake Island area that day. Ro-62 followed on 14 December 1941. Ro-62 was on the surface 25 nautical miles (46 km; 29 mi) southwest of Wake Island to recharge her batteries in a heavy squall in the predawn darkness of 17 December 1941 when her lookouts suddenly sighted her sister ship, the submarine Ro-66, also on the surface and recharging batteries. Both submarines attempted to back off, but it was too late to avoid a collision, and Ro-62 rammed Ro-66 at 20:20 Japan Standard Time. Ro-66 sank at 19°10′N 166°28′E with the loss of 63 lives. Ro-62 rescued her three survivors, who had been thrown overboard by the collision.

The Battle of Wake Island ended as Wake Island fell to the Japanese on 23 December 1941. Ro-62 returned to Kwajalein on 28 December 1941. She and Ro-61 were reassigned to the Marshalls Area Guard Unit on 5 January 1942 and patrolled off Kwajalein thereafter.

Carrier aircraft of United States Navy Task Force 8 raided Kwajalein on 1 February 1942. Two hours later, the Japanese 6th Fleet ordered the submarines of Submarine Squadron 1 — Ro-61, Ro-62, I-9, I-15, I-17, I-19, I-23, I-25, and I-26 — to intercept the American task force, but none of the submarines made contact with it.

In March 1942, Ro-61 and Ro-62 made their way to Japan, calling at Truk in the Caroline Islands from 9 to 19 March and pausing briefly at Saipan in the Mariana Islands on 22–23 March before arriving at Sasebo on 30 March 1942. The two submarines departed Sasebo on 31 May 1942, called at Saipan from 6 to 7 June 1942, and arrived at Truk on 10 June 1942. Recalled to Japan, they got underway from Truk on 27 June 1942 bound for Yokosuka, Japan, which they reached on 5 July 1942.

==== Aleutian Islands campaign ====
On 14 July 1942, Submarine Division 26 was reassigned to the 5th Fleet for service in the Aleutian Islands, where the Aleutian Islands campaign had begun in June 1942 with the Japanese occupation of Attu and Kiska. Ro-61 and Ro-62 departed Yokosuka on 24 July 1942 bound for Paramushiro in the northern Kurile Islands, where they arrived on 30 July 1942. They put to sea again on 1 August 1942 to head for Kiska, which they reached on 5 August 1942. Thereafter, they were based there along with the submarines I-6, Ro-63, Ro-64, Ro-65, Ro-67, and Ro-68.

On 7 August 1942, an American task force bombarded Kiska while I-6, Ro-61, Ro-64, and Ro-68 were anchored in the harbor, and they crash-dived to avoid damage. On 8 August 1942, Ro-62 sortied to intercept the American ships, but failed to find them.

On 28 August 1942, a Kiska-based Aichi E13A1 (Allied reporting name "Jake") reconnaissance floatplane sighted the U.S. Navy seaplane tender USS Casco (AVP-12) — which the plane's crew mistakenly identified as a light cruiser — and a destroyer in Nazan Bay on the coast of Atka. Ro-61, Ro-62, and Ro-64 received orders that day to intercept the ships, and all three of them were off Atka on 29 August 1942. On 30 August 1942, the submarines received orders to attack an American task force that was occupying Adak, but Ro-62 found no targets and returned to Kiska on 5 September 1942.

On 14 September 1942, aircraft of the United States Army Air Forces Eleventh Air Force raided Kiska. They strafed Ro-68, but Ro-62 escaped damage. During the remainder of September 1942, Ro-62 made two patrols in the vicinity of Kiska, one from 19 to 21 September and other from 29 to 30 September, but both patrols were uneventful. On 1 October 1942 she departed Kiska to patrol off Crook Bay on the northern coast of Adak. She operated in her patrol area from 3 to 5 October 1942 without finding any targets and returned to Kiska on 8 October 1942.

Ro-62 made several short sorties from Kiska between 10 and 17 October 1942, apparently to test equipment. After an air pump failed, she departed Kiska on 18 October 1942 bound for Paramushiro, which she reached on 23 October 1942. She later got back underway, called at Ōminato, Japan, from 29 October to 1 November 1942, and proceeded to Yokosuka, where she arrived on 5 November 1942. She later moved to Kure, Japan.

==== Training duties ====
On 15 November 1942, Submarine Division 26 was reassigned to the training department of the Kure Guard Unit and Ro-62 began duty as a training submarine. On 1 December 1942, Submarine Division 26 was disbanded and its submarines were reassigned to Submarine Division 33. Ro-62 was transferred to the Kure Submarine Squadron on 10 October 1944. On 12 April 1945 she was reassigned to Submarine Division 33 to operate as a training submarine at the submarine school at Ōtake, Japan.

==== End of war ====
Ro-62 was at Maizuru, Japan, when hostilities between Japan and the Allies ended on 15 August 1945. She departed Maizuru on 21 August 1945 and proceeded to Kure, where on 26 August 1945 her manning was reduced to a skeleton crew. On 28 August 1945, her remaining crew ceremonially lowered her battle flag and also left her. She surrendered to the Allies in September 1945.

== Disposal ==
The Japanese struck Ro-62 from the Navy list on 20 November 1945. Allied forces scuttled her in the Iyo Nada in the Seto Inland Sea in May 1946.

== Bibliography ==
- "Rekishi Gunzō"., History of Pacific War Extra, "Perfect guide, The submarines of the Imperial Japanese Forces", Gakken (Japan), March 2005, ISBN 4-05-603890-2
- The Maru Special, Japanese Naval Vessels No.43 Japanese Submarines III, Ushio Shobō (Japan), September 1980, Book code 68343–44
- The Maru Special, Japanese Naval Vessels No.132 Japanese Submarines I "Revised edition", Ushio Shobō (Japan), February 1988, Book code 68344–36
- The Maru Special, Japanese Naval Vessels No.133 Japanese Submarines II "Revised edition", Ushio Shobō (Japan), March 1988, Book code 68344-37
