= Japanese submarine Ro-63 =

1924 Japanese submarine

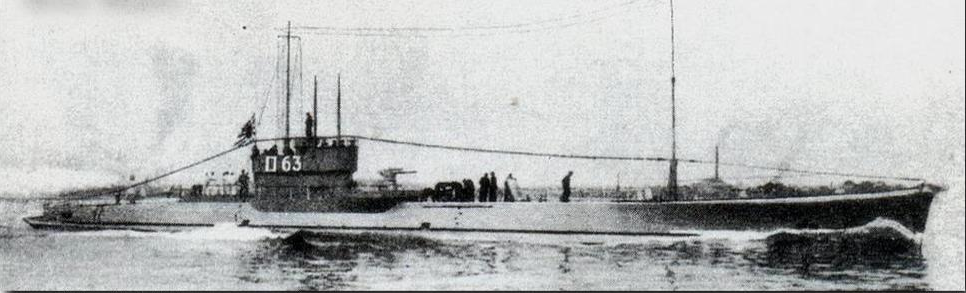
- Ro-63 on sea trials, 25 October 1924

History

Japan
- Name: Submarine No. 84
- Builder: Mitsubishi, Kobe, Japan
- Laid down: 2 April 1923
- Launched: 24 January 1924
- Renamed: Ro-63 on 1 November 1924
- Completed: 20 December 1924
- Commissioned: 20 December 1924
- Decommissioned: 10 March 1929
- Recommissioned: 29 June 1929
- Decommissioned: 1 December 1932
- Recommissioned: 20 March 1934
- Fate: Surrendered September 1945; Stricken 20 November 1945; Scuttled May 1946

General characteristics
- Class & type: Type L4 (Ro-60-class) submarine
- Displacement: 988 long tons (1,004 t) (surfaced); 1,301 tons (1,322 t) (submerged)
- Length: 78.39 m (257 ft 2 in)
- Beam: 7.41 m (24 ft 4 in)
- Draft: 3.96 m (13 ft 0 in)
- Propulsion: 2 × Vickers diesels, 2 shafts 2,400 bhp (surfaced), 1,600 (submerged)
- Speed: 15.7 knots (29.1 km/h) (surfaced); 8.6 knots (15.9 km/h) (submerged)
- Range: 5,500 nautical miles (10,200 km) at 10 knots (19 km/h) (surfaced); 80 nautical miles (150 km) at 5.7 knots (10.6 km/h) (submerged)
- Test depth: 60 m (200 ft)
- Complement: 48
- Armament: 6 × 533 mm torpedo tubes (6 × bow); 12 × 6th Year Type torpedoes; 1 × 76.2 mm (3.00 in) L/40 naval gun; 1 × 6.5 mm machine gun

Ro-63, originally named Submarine No. 84, was an Imperial Japanese Navy Type L submarine of the L4 subclass. First commissioned in 1924, she served in the waters of Japan prior to World War II. During World War II, she operated in the Central Pacific and took part in the Aleutian Islands campaign, then in late 1942 was relegated to a role as a training ship and tender for midget submarines. After the war ended in 1945, she surrendered to the Allies, which scuttled her in 1946.

== Design and description ==
The submarines of the Type L4 sub-class were copies of the Group 3 subclass of the British L-class submarine built under license in Japan. They were slightly larger and had two more torpedo tubes than the preceding submarines of the L3 subclass. They displaced 1,004 tonnes (988 long tons) surfaced and 1,322 tonnes (1,301 long tons) submerged. The submarines were 78.39 meters (257 ft 2 in) long and had a beam of 7.41 meters (24 ft 4 in) and a draft of 3.96 meters (13 ft 0 in). They had a diving depth of 60 meters (197 ft).

For surface running, the submarines were powered by two 1,200-brake-horsepower (895 kW) Vickers diesel engines, each driving one propeller shaft. When submerged, each propeller was driven by an 800-shaft-horsepower (597 kW) electric motor. They could reach 15.7 knots (29.1 km/h; 18.1 mph) on the surface and 8.6 knots (15.9 km/h; 9.9 mph) underwater. On the surface, they had a range of 5,500 nautical miles (10,200 km; 6,300 mi) at 10 knots (19 km/h; 12 mph); submerged, they had a range of 80 nmi (150 km; 92 mi) at 4 knots (7.4 km/h; 4.6 mph).

The submarines were armed with six internal 533 mm (21 in) torpedo tubes, all in the bow, and carried a total of twelve 6th Year Type torpedoes. They were also armed with a single 76.2 mm (3 in) deck gun and a 6.5 mm machine gun.

== Construction and commissioning ==
Ro-63 was laid down as Submarine No. 84 on 2 April 1923 by Mitsubishi at Kobe, Japan. Launched on 24 January 1924, she was renamed Ro-63 on 1 November 1924 while fitting out. She was completed and commissioned on 20 December 1924.

== Service history ==
=== Pre-World War II ===
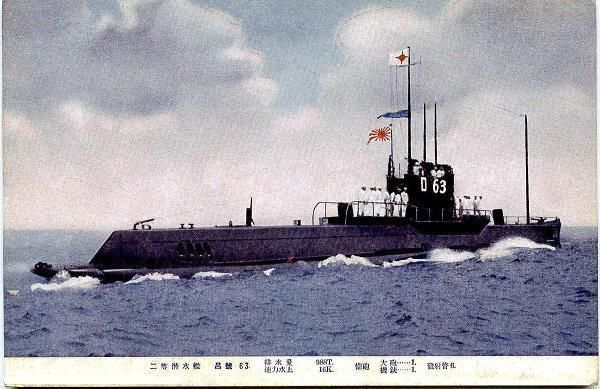
Postcard of Ro-63

Upon commissioning, Ro-63 was attached to the Maizuru Naval District and assigned to Submarine Division 33. On 1 June 1925, she was transferred to the Sasebo Naval District and reassigned to Submarine Division 24, in which she remained until 1939. Submarine Division 24 was reassigned to Submarine Squadron 1 in the 1st Fleet in the Combined Fleet on 1 December 1925. On 1 March 1926, Ro-63 and the submarines Ro-57, Ro-58, Ro-59, Ro-60, Ro-61, Ro-62, Ro-64, and Ro-68 departed Sasebo, Japan, bound for Okinawa, which they reached the same day. The nine submarines got underway from Okinawa on 30 March 1926 for a training cruise in Chinese waters off Shanghai and Amoy which concluded with their arrival at Mako in the Pescadores Islands on 5 April 1926. They departed Mako on 20 April 1926 for the return leg of their training cruise, operating off China near Chusan Island, then returned to Sasebo on 26 April 1926. On 27 March 1927, Ro-60, Ro-61, Ro-62, Ro-63, Ro-64, and Ro-68 departed Saeki Bay, Japan, for a training cruise off Qingdao, China, which they concluded with their arrival at Sasebo, Japan, on 16 May 1927.

On 10 December 1928, Submarine Division 24 was transferred back to the Sasebo Naval District and began service in the Sasebo Defense Division. Ro-63 was decommissioned on 10 March 1929 and placed in reserve at Maizuru, but was recommissioned on 29 June 1929. While proceeding to Sasebo, Japan, on 13 November 1929 after conducting diving exercises with Ro-64, Ro-63 collided off Sasebo with the small Japanese motor vessel Segawa Maru, suffering minor damage to her starboard bow.

Submarine Division 24 returned to duty in Submarine Squadron 1 in the 1st Fleet on 30 November 1929. It transferred back to the Sasebo Naval District on 1 December 1930 and began a stint in the Sasebo Defense Division on 1 December 1931. Ro-63 again was decommissioned on 1 December 1932 and placed in reserve at Maizuru.

Ro-63 was recommissioned on 20 March 1934, resuming active service in Submarine Division 24, which by then was assigned to the Sasebo Guard Squadron in the Sasebo Naval District. The division's service in the Sasebo Guard Squadron ended on 15 November 1934, after which it was assigned directly to the Sasebo Naval District until 1 December 1936, when it was assigned to the Sasebo Defense Squadron. It resumed its direct assignment to the Sasebo Naval District on 1 January 1938.

Ro-63 was transferred to Submarine Division 33 on either 1 September or 15 November 1938, according to different sources, for service at the submarine school at Kure, Japan. On 15 November 1939, Submarine Division 33 was reassigned to Submarine Squadron 7 in the 4th Fleet in the Combined Fleet. When the Imperial Japanese Navy deployed for the upcoming conflict in the Pacific, Ro-63 was at Kwajalein in the Marshall Islands. She received the message "Climb Mount Niitaka 1208" (Japanese: Niitakayama nobore 1208) from the Combined Fleet on 2 December 1941, indicating that war with the Allies would commence on 8 December 1941 Japan time, which was on 7 December 1941 on the other side of the International Date Line in Hawaii, where Japanese plans called for the war to open with their attack on Pearl Harbor.

=== World War II ===
==== Central Pacific ====
Ro-63 was with the other submarines of Submarine Division 33 — Ro-64 and Ro-68 — at Kwajalein when Japan entered World War II on 8 December 1941, Kwajalein time. That day, she got underway to conduct a reconnaissance of Howland Island. She sighted an enemy plane 85 nautical miles (157 km; 98 mi) northwest of Howland on 12 December, reconnoitered Howland on 14 and 15 December, and returned to Kwajalein on 19 December 1941.

Ro-63 departed Kwajalein on 7 January 1942 and called at Truk in the Caroline Islands from 11 to 15 January before getting back underway in company with Ro-64 and Ro-68 to conduct a reconnaissance of Rabaul on New Britain in the Admiralty Islands. She then patrolled south of Cape St. George on New Ireland before returning to Truk on 29 January 1942.

Ro-63, Ro-64, and Ro-68 left Truk on 18 February 1942, called at Ponape from 23 to 24 February, and then set out for the Marshall Islands area. During their voyage, however, Ro-63′s horizontal rudder failed on 27 February 1942, and she proceeded to Bikini Atoll for repairs in company with Ro-64. The two submarines reached Bikini on 28 February 1942. They got back underway on 1 March 1942, but Ro-63′s jury-rigged rudder quickly broke again and she turned back to Bikini while Ro-64 proceeded independently. On 2 March 1942, she departed Bikini to head for Japan for repairs, calling along the way at Ponape from 5 to 7 March 1942, at Truk from 9 to 19 March 1942, and at Saipan in the Mariana Islands from 22 to 26 March 1942 before arriving at Maizuru on 3 April 1942.

After her repairs were completed, Ro-63 departed Maizuru on 5 June 1942, arrived at Saipan on 13 June, and then made for Truk. Recalled to Japan, she departed Truk on 27 June 1942 bound for Yokosuka, Japan, which she reached on 4 July 1942.

==== Aleutian Islands campaign ====
On 14 July 1942, Submarine Division 33 was reassigned to the 5th Fleet for service in the Aleutian Islands, where the Aleutian Islands campaign had begun in June 1942 with the Japanese occupation of Attu and Kiska. At 16:00 on 24 July 1942, Ro-63, Ro-64, and Ro-68 departed Yokosuka bound for Paramushiro in the northern Kurile Islands. Ro-64 was forced to return to Yokosuka when food poisoning broke out among her crew, but Ro-63 and Ro-68 pressed on and arrived at Paramushiro on 29 July 1942. Ro-63 and Ro-68 put to sea again on 31 July 1942 to head for Kiska, which they reached on 4 August 1942. Thereafter, they were based there along with the submarines I-6, Ro-61, Ro-62, Ro-64, Ro-65, and Ro-67.

On 7 August 1942, an American task force bombarded Kiska while I-6, Ro-61, Ro-64, and Ro-68 were anchored in the harbor, and they crash-dived to avoid damage. Between 8 and 10 August 1942, Ro-61, Ro-63, Ro-64, and Ro-68 sought to intercept the American ships, but failed to find them. From 11 to 13 August 1942, Ro-63 participated with Ro-64 and Ro-68 in a search for the crew of a ditched reconnaissance plane, and Ro-63 subsequently conducted patrols off the Aleutians from her base at Kiska from 17 to 20 August, 28 to 30 August, 3 to 5 September, and 6 to 11 September 1942.

On 14 September 1942, Ro-63 was anchored at Kiska when American aircraft raided the base. She submerged to avoid attack, but a bomb a United States Army Air Forces Eleventh Air Force B-24 Liberator dropped nonetheless damaged one of her periscopes while she was underwater. Submarine Division 33 was attached directly to the 51st Base Unit at Kiska on 15 September 1942, and Ro-63 carried out another Aleutians patrol from 22 to 24 September 1942.

While Ro-63 was at Kiska on 25 September 1942, Submarine Division 33 was reassigned to the Kure Naval District. Ro-63, Ro-64, and Ro-68 departed Kiska on 26 September 1942 bound for Maizuru, where they arrived on 5 October 1942.

==== Training and tender duties ====
Ro-63 departed Maizuru on 6 November 1942 and arrived at Kure on 8 November 1942. Thereafter, Submarine Division 33 was assigned to training duties in the Kure Naval District. It was assigned to the Kure Submarine Squadron on 1 December 1943.

On 28 March 1945, Ro-63 was selected for conversion to a tender for Type D (Kōryū) midget submarines based on Amami Ōshima in the Amami Islands. After completion of a makeshift conversion at the Kure Naval Arsenal that included the installation of a Type 96 25 mm anti-aircraft gun and a radar detector, Ro-63 departed Kure on 8 April 1945, stopped at Sasebo, and then got underway from Sasebo on 10 April 1945 bound for Amami Ōshima. She arrived at Koniya on Amami Ōshima on 13 April 1945 and unloaded her cargo of torpedoes and spare parts. Continual Allied air attacks forced her to remain submerged on the harbor bottom at Koniya by day and surface only at night to perform her tender duties during darkness. On 29 April 1945, she received orders to return to Sasebo. After loading a cargo of sugar at Kasari Bay on Amami Ōshima on 30 April, Ro-63 headed for Sasebo, which she reached on 3 May 1945.

After her arrival at Sasebo, Ro-63 was drydocked until mid-May 1945, when she proceeded to Ōtake, Japan, to resume her training activities at the submarine school there. She was at Maizuru when hostilities between Japan and the Allies ended on 15 August 1945. She subsequently surrendered to Allied forces.

== Disposal ==
The Japanese struck Ro-63 from the Navy list on 20 November 1945. Allied forces scuttled her in the Iyo Nada in the Seto Inland Sea in May 1946.

== Bibliography ==
- "Rekishi Gunzō"., History of Pacific War Extra, "Perfect guide, The submarines of the Imperial Japanese Forces", Gakken (Japan), March 2005, ISBN 4-05-603890-2
- The Maru Special, Japanese Naval Vessels No.43 Japanese Submarines III, Ushio Shobō (Japan), September 1980, Book code 68343–44
- The Maru Special, Japanese Naval Vessels No.132 Japanese Submarines I "Revised edition", Ushio Shobō (Japan), February 1988, Book code 68344–36
- The Maru Special, Japanese Naval Vessels No.133 Japanese Submarines II "Revised edition", Ushio Shobō (Japan), March 1988, Book code 68344-37
