= Japanese aircraft transport Goshū Maru =

History

Japan
- Name: Goshū Maru
- Builder: Kawasaki Heavy Industries, Kōbe
- Laid down: 27 December 1938
- Launched: 14 October 1939
- Completed: 27 February 1940
- Commissioned: requisitioned 14 September 1940
- In service: 27 February 1940
- Out of service: 31 March 1944
- Stricken: 21 April 1944
- Fate: Sunk 30 or 31 March 1944

General characteristics
- Displacement: 8,592 tons standard
- Length: 443.2 feet
- Beam: 60 feet
- Draft: 40 feet
- Propulsion: 2 steam turbines
- Armament: 4.7-inch guns

Goshū Maru was requisitioned as an aircraft transport vessel of the Imperial Japanese Navy (IJN). The ship was initially built at Kawasaki's Kōbe Shipyard and launched on 14 October 1939 as a merchant vessel for Goyo Shosen K. K. On 14 September 1940 the IJN requisitioned as a transport ship and was refitted in 1940 as an aircraft transport. The ship subsequently saw service in the Pacific Campaign of World War II.

On 13 May 1942, Goshu Maru received orders to pick up aviation supplies and then to sail with an occupation force bound for a target called AF. This transmission was intercepted by the US Navy, who quickly deduced that the target AF was Midway, leading to one of the most important battles in Naval history.

1 October 1943 she was rerated a converted transport (misc). Goshū Maru was sunk by United States Navy aircraft in the Palau Islands on 30 or 31 March 1944.
