= Japanese Type L submarine =

Imperial Japanese Navy submarine class

Class overview
- Name: Type L submarines
- Builders: Mitsubishi Heavy Industries-Kōbe Shipyard
- Operators: Imperial Japanese Navy
- Subclasses: Type L1 (Ro-51-class); Type L2 (Ro-53-class); Type L3 (Ro-57-class); Type L4 (Ro-60 -class)
- Built: 1918-1927
- In commission: 1920-1945

The Type L submarine (L型潜水艦, L-gata Sensuikan) submarines were medium-sized submarines of the Imperial Japanese Navy (IJN), serving during the 1920s and World War II. The Type L submarines were built with Vickers naval technical guidance. All boats were built in the Mitsubishi Heavy Industries-Kobe Shipyard by the contract with Vickers.

== Class variants ==
The Type L submarines were divided into four classes:

- Type L1 (L1型（呂五十一型）, Ro-go-jū-ichi-gata, Ro-51-class)
- Type L2 (L2型（呂五十三型）, Ro-go-jū-san-gata, Ro-53-class)
- Type L3 (L3型（呂五十七型）, Ro-go-jū-shichi-gata, Ro-57-class)
- Type L4 (L4型（呂六十型）, Ro-roku-jū-gata, Ro-60-class)

=== Type L1 (Ro-51-class) ===
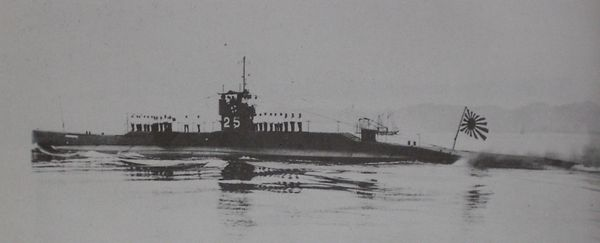
Ro-51 (as Submarine No. 25) in the 1920s

In 1916, the Mitsubishi Shipbuilding Corporation got the Vickers L class submarine informations. Mitsubishi which lost competition to the Kawasaki's Type F submarines (Fiat-Laurenti design, Ro-1 class and Ro-3 class), bought the license for the L class submarine from Vickers. The IJN hoped an improvement of submarine technologies will be achieved and ordered this submarine from Mitsubishi. Mitsubishi bought six submarine kits, and built two boats by semi-knock down. The submarine crews were satisfied with the Vickers diesels because they proved to be reliable. The IJN studied the diesel engines and made many variants of similar design, for example: Kampon Mk.24 diesel for the Ro-100 class.

- Boats in class

Boat	Laid down	Launched	Completed	Note, fate
Ro-51 ex-Submarine No. 25	10–08–1918	10–10–1919	30–06–1920	Renamed Ro-51 01–11–1924. Decommissioned 01–04–1940.
Ro-52 ex-Submarine No. 26	10–08–1918	09–03–1920	30–11–1920	Renamed Ro-52 01–11–1924. Decommissioned 01–04–1932.

=== Type L2 (Ro-53-class) ===
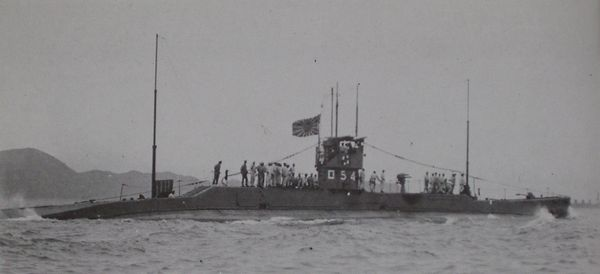
Ro-54 in the 1920s

The Type L2 had minor changes from the Type L1. The changes were:

- The ship's side torpedo tubes were removed.
- Changed the batteries. (The L1 was equipped 3 groups, 336 small-sized batteries. The L2 was equipped 2 groups, 224 medium-sized batteries.)
- Boats in class

Boat	Laid down	Launched	Completed	Note, fate
Ro-53 ex-Submarine No. 27	01–04–1919	06–07–1919	10–03–1921	Renamed Ro-53 01–11–1924. Decommissioned 01–04–1940.
Ro-54 ex-Submarine No. 28	01–11–1919	13–11–1920	10–09–1921	Renamed Ro-54 01–11–1924. Decommissioned 01–04–1940.
Ro-55 ex-Submarine No. 29	30–03–1920	10–02–1921	15–11–1921	Renamed Ro-55 01–11–1924. Decommissioned 01–04–1940.
Ro-56 ex-Submarine No. 30	10–07–1920	11–05–1921	16–01–1922	Renamed Ro-56 01–11–1924. Decommissioned 01–04–1940.

=== Type L3 (Ro-57-class) ===
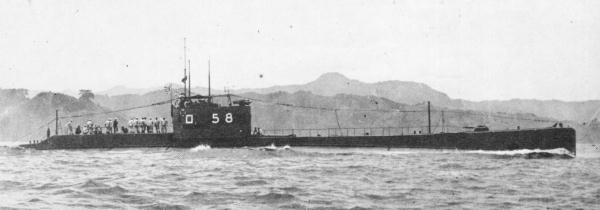
Ro-58 in 1925

The Type L3 is a license production model of the British L class submarine Group 2.

- Boats in class

Boat	Laid down	Launched	Completed	Results	Note, fate
Ro-57 ex-Submarine No. 46	20–11–1920	03–12–1921	30–07–1922		Renamed Ro-57 01–11–1924. Decommissioned 20–11–1945. Later scuttled off Kure.
Ro-58 ex-Submarine No. 47	15–02–1921	02–03–1922	25–11–1922		Renamed Ro-58 01–11–1924. Decommissioned 15–09–1945. Later scuttled off Shimizu.
Ro-59 ex-Submarine No. 57	18–05–1921	28–06–1922	20–03–1923		Renamed Ro-59 01–11–1924. Decommissioned 20–11–1945. Scuttled at Iyo-nada, May 1946.

=== Type L4 (Ro-60-class) ===
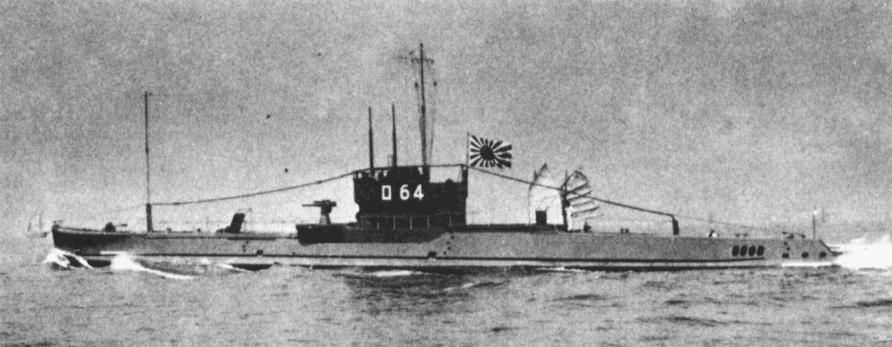
Ro-64

The Type L4 is a license production model of the British L class submarine Group 3. Their performance was good. The IJN was satisfied with them and stopped the development of Kaichū type submarines for a long time. Later the IJN was not able to regain the technical delay in development of the medium-sized submarines until the end of the Pacific War.

- Boats in class

Boat	Laid down	Launched	Completed	Results	Note, fate
Ro-60 ex-Submarine No. 59	05–12–1921	20–12–1922	17–09–1923		Renamed Ro-60 01–11–1924. Lost in an accident at Kwajalein 29–12–1941.
Ro-61 ex-Submarine No. 72	05–06–1922	19–05–1923	09–02–1924	Damaged USS Casco 30–08–1942	Renamed Ro-61 01–11–1924. Sunk by USS Reid 31–08–1942.
Ro-62 ex-Submarine No. 73	08–09–1922	29–09–1923	24–07–1924		Renamed Ro-62 01–11–1924. Decommissioned 20–11–1945. Scuttled at Iyo-nada, May 1946.
Ro-63 ex-Submarine No. 84	02–04–1923	24–01–1924	20–12–1924		Renamed Ro-63 01–11–1924. Decommissioned 20–11–1945. Scuttled at Iyo-nada, May 1946.
Ro-64 ex-Submarine No. 79	15–10–1923	19–08–1924	30–04–1925		Renamed Ro-64 01–11–1924. Sunk by naval mine at Hiroshima Bay 12–04–1945.
Ro-65	15–11–1924	19–09–1925	30–06–1926		Lost in an accident at Kiska 04–11–1942.
Ro-66	01–12–1925	25–10–1926	28–07–1927		Collided with Ro-62 and sunk southwest of Wake Island 17–12–1941.
Ro-67	05–03–1925	18–03–1926	15–12–1926		Decommissioned 20–07–1945. Scuttled off Sasebo, July 1948.
Ro-68	06–02–1924	23–02–1925	29–10–1925		Decommissioned 30–11–1945. Scuttled off Maizuru, 30–04–1946.

== Characteristics ==
Type		L1 (Ro-51)	L2 (Ro-53)	L3 (Ro-57)	L4 (Ro-60)
Displacement	Surfaced	893 long tons (907 t)	893 long tons (907 t)	889 long tons (903 t)	988 long tons (1,004 t)
Displacement	Submerged	1,075.2 long tons (1,092 t)	1,075.3 long tons (1,093 t)	1,102.7 long tons (1,120 t)	1,301 long tons (1,322 t)
Length (overall)		70.59 m (231 ft 7 in)	70.59 m (231 ft 7 in)	72.89 m (239 ft 2 in)	78.39 m (257 ft 2 in)
Beam		7.16 m (23 ft 6 in)	7.16 m (23 ft 6 in)	7.16 m (23 ft 6 in)	7.41 m (24 ft 4 in)
Draft		3.90 m (12 ft 10 in)	3.94 m (12 ft 11 in)	3.96 m (13 ft 0 in)	3.96 m (13 ft 0 in)
Power plant and shaft		2 × Vickers diesels, 2 shafts	2 × Vickers diesels, 2 shafts	2 × Vickers diesels, 2 shafts	2 × Vickers diesels, 2 shafts
Power	Surfaced	2,400 bhp	2,400 bhp	2,400 bhp	2,400 bhp
Power	Submerged	1,600 shp	1,600 shp	1,600 shp	1,600 shp
Speed	Surfaced	17 knots (31 km/h)	17.3 knots (32.0 km/h)	17.1 knots (31.7 km/h)	15.7 knots (29.1 km/h)
Speed	Submerged	10.2 knots (18.9 km/h)	10.4 knots (19.3 km/h)	9.1 knots (16.9 km/h)	8.6 knots (15.9 km/h)
Range	Surfaced	5,500 nmi (10,200 km) at 10 knots (19 km/h)	5,500 nmi (10,200 km) at 10 knots (19 km/h)	5,500 nmi (10,200 km) at 10 knots (19 km/h)	5,500 nmi (10,200 km) at 10 knots (19 km/h)
Range	Submerged	80 nmi (150 km) at 4 knots (7.4 km/h)	80 nmi (150 km) at 4 knots (7.4 km/h)	80 nmi (150 km) at 4 knots (7.4 km/h)	80 nmi (150 km) at 4 knots (7.4 km/h)
Test depth		60 m (200 ft)	60 m (200 ft)	60 m (200 ft)	60 m (200 ft)
Fuel		75 tons	75 tons	75 tons	75 tons
Complement		45	45	46	48
Armament (initial)		• 6 × 450 mm (18 in) TTs (4 × bow, 2 × broadside) • 10 × Type 44 torpedoes • 1 × 76.2 mm (3.00 in) L/23.5 AA gun	• 4 × 450 mm TTs (4 × bow) • 8 × Type 44 torpedoes • 1 × 76.2 mm L/23.5 AA gun	• 4 × 533 mm (21 in) TTs (4 × bow) • 8 × 6th Year Type torpedoes • 1 × 76.2 mm L/23.5 AA gun • 1 × 6.5 mm machine gun	• 6 × 533 mm TTs (6 × bow) • 12 × 6th Year Type torpedoes • 1 × 76.2 mm (3.00 in) L/40 naval gun • 1 × 6.5 mm machine gun

== Bibliography ==
- "Rekishi Gunzō"., History of Pacific War Extra, "Perfect guide, The submarines of the Imperial Japanese Forces", Gakken (Japan), March 2005, ISBN 4-05-603890-2
- The Maru Special, Japanese Naval Vessels No.43 Japanese Submarines III, Ushio Shobō (Japan), September 1980, Book code 68343–44
- The Maru Special, Japanese Naval Vessels No.132 Japanese Submarines I "Revised edition", Ushio Shobō (Japan), February 1988, Book code 68344–36
- The Maru Special, Japanese Naval Vessels No.133 Japanese Submarines II "Revised edition", Ushio Shobō (Japan), March 1988, Book code 68344-37
