= Zhoushan Island =

Island off the coast of China

Zhoushan
Native name: 舟山岛
- Location within Zhejiang Location within Eastern China Location within China

Geography
- Location: East China Sea
- Coordinates: 30°03′28″N 122°08′17″E
- Archipelago: Zhoushan Islands
- Area: 502.65 km^{2} (194.07 sq mi)
- Length: 44 km (27.3 mi)
- Width: 18 km (11.2 mi)
- Highest elevation: 503.6 m (1652.2 ft)

Administration
- China
- Province: Zhejiang Province

Demographics
- Population: 502,667
- Pop. density: 875.36/km^{2} (2267.17/sq mi)

Zhoushan Island
- Simplified Chinese: 舟山岛
- Postal: Chusan Island
Transcriptions
Standard Mandarin
- Hanyu Pinyin: Zhōushān Dǎo
- Wade–Giles: Chou^{1}-shan^{1} Tao^{3}
Wu
- Romanization: Tseu^{平}se^{平} toh^{去}

Zhoushan Island is the principal and namesake island in the Zhoushan Islands, formerly romanized as the Chusan Islands, an archipelago administered by Zhoushan Prefecture in Zhejiang Province in the People's Republic of China. It is the province's largest island and 3rd-largest in mainland China after Hainan and Chongming. The island is the district seat of both Dinghai and Putuo. The island was the site of the first and second capture of Chusan during the First Opium War.

When referred to as a port, the Port of Zhoushan (舟山市) refers to the prefecture-level "city" consisting of Zhoushan island as well as the other nearby outlying islands, in Zhejiang. The former name of Zhoushan was Dinghai (定海). The Port of Zhoushan is a popular port for bulk carriers.

== Name ==
The name Zhoushan means "Boat" and refers to the shape of the island on a map.

== Geography ==
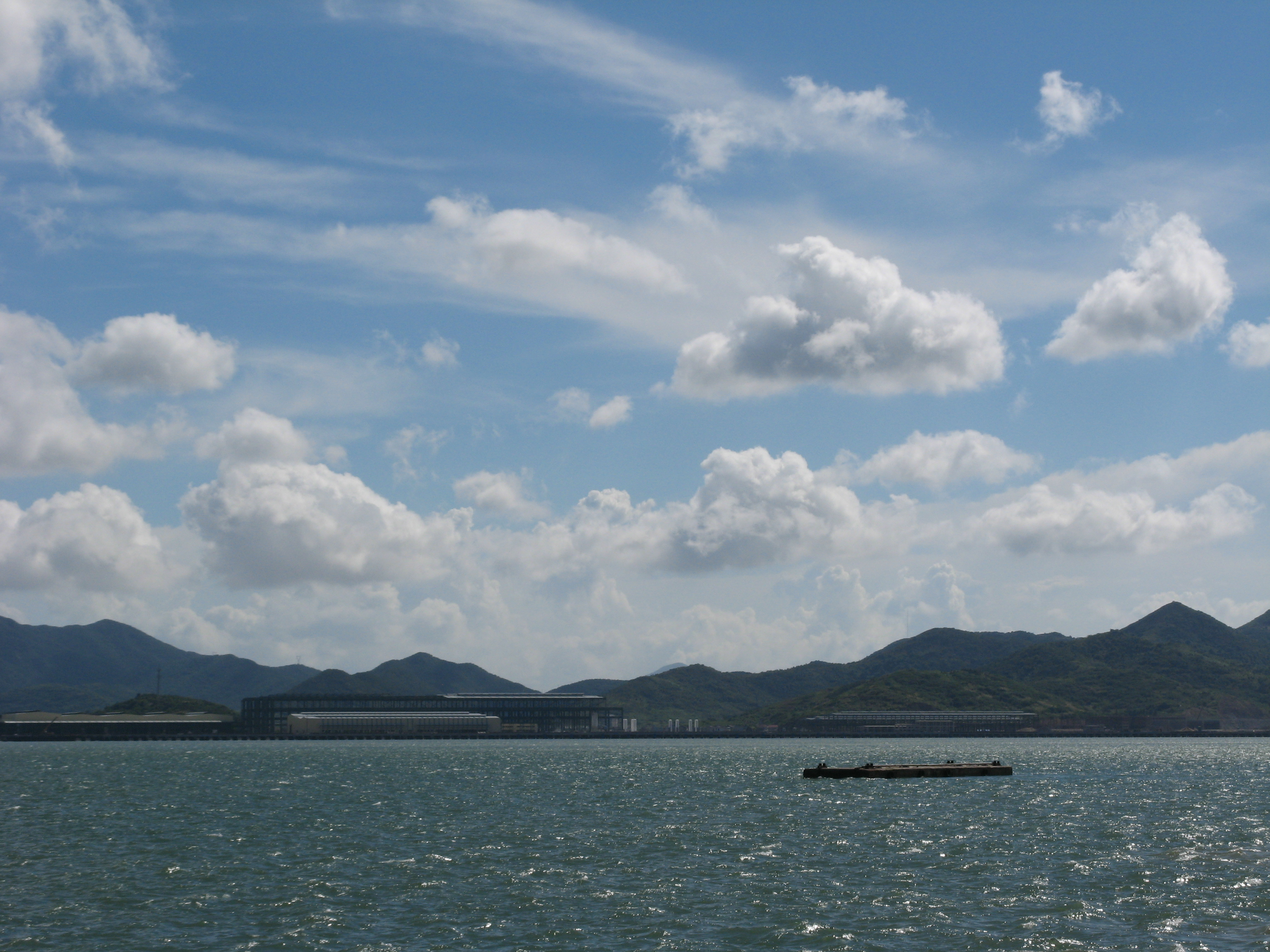
The Changhai Channel is a channel dividing Changbai Island and Zhoushan Main Island

At 30° N. 122° E., it lies northwest to southeast, and has a 170.16 km (105.73 mi) coastline, 44 km (27 mi) at its longest point 18 km (11 mi) at its narrowest. Its area is 502.65 km^{2} (including tidal zone). At its closest point, it is 9.1 kilometers (5.7 mi) from the Chinese mainland. It rises to an altitude of 503.6 meters (1,652 ft).

The island has a varied range of landscape, with hill and dale, as well as watered with numerous small streams, of which the most considerable is the Dongjiang (East River), passing into the harbour of Dinghai. There are several hundred ports around the islands, separated into three areas: Dinghai Port Zone, Shen-jia-men Port Zone (沈家门港区), and Laotangshan Port Zone (老塘山港区). The tourism regions include the regions of Shen-jia-men and Dinghai.

== History and attractions ==
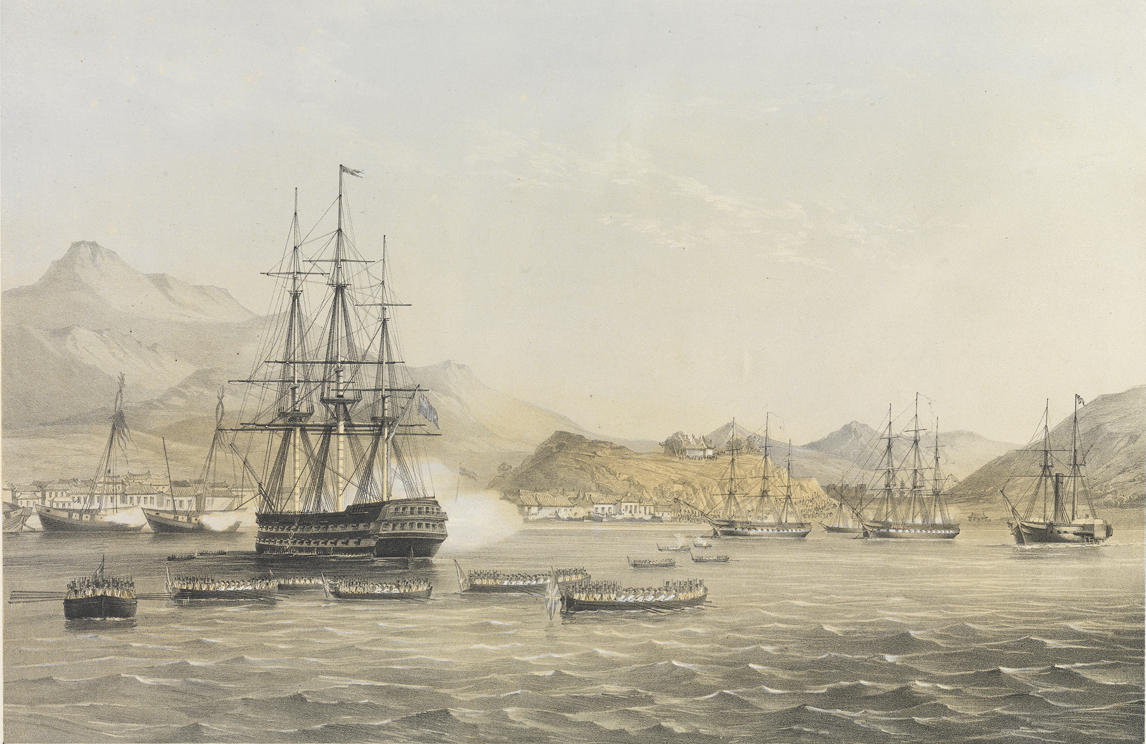
British ships attacking the island as the troops prepare to land in 1840

The island was the site of the first and second capture of Chusan during the First Opium War. A number of historical sites and monuments on the island are popular tourist attractions.

On the peak of Qinglong Mountain, there is a memorial tablet dedicated to those killed during wars. Dinghai has a number of sites related to the Opium War:

- Opium War Memorial Park (鸦片战争纪念公园)
- Shrine of the Three Loyalists (三忠祠): commemorates generals Ge Yunfei, Zheng Guohong (鄭國鴻) and Wang Ximing (王錫朋), who were killed in action.
- The Tablet of the Martyring Site of Lord Yao (姚公殉难处碑)
- The Tablet of the Martyring Site of Mr. Li (义士李先生殉难处碑)
- The Cannon Platform from the Fortress of Zhengyuan (震远城炮台)
- Remnants of the Town of Daotou (道头土城)

There also those about the Ming-Qing contention:

- The Realm of Tonggui (同归域; 同歸域, literally "The Realm where [All Are] Reunited in the Journey [to the Hereafter]"), built in 1651 to bury the unidentified remains of anti-Qing resistant fighters and civilians who died during the battles.
- The Well of Imperial Yuan Consort of the Prince of Lu (鲁王元妃宫井), where a Southern Ming queen leapt to her death as the fall of the Ming was imminent.

Other sites include:

- Zuyin Temple (祖印寺), a Chan Buddhist place of worship and meditation with a lineage dating back to 940, when a monastery on the nearby island of Qúshan (衢山) named the Haven of Penglai (蓬莱院) was founded. The monks moved to the current location in the 1230s.
- Sanmao Memorial Museum (三毛祖居纪念馆), dedicated to a popular Taiwanese author of Mainlander origin.

== Subdivisions ==
440 000 people, mostly Han, in 150 000 households live in the following 17 subdivisions of Dinghai and Putuo Districts on Zhoushan Island:

10+ sub-districts:

- Jiefang (解放, local dialect: Kafaon), district seat of Dinghai
- Changguo (昌国, Tshaonkoh), old municipal seat of Zhoushan
- Huannan (环南, Guaenei)
- Chengdong (城东, Jinton)
- Yancang (盐仓, Yietshaon)
- Lincheng (临城, Linjin), new municipal seat of Zhoushan
- Shenjiamen (沈家门, Shinkomen), district seat of Putuo
- Goushan (勾山, Keusae)
- Donggang (东港, Tonkaon)
- Zhanmao (展茅, Ciemau)
- Ma'ao (马岙, Mo'au)
- Cengang (岑港, Dzenkaon)
- Xiaosha (小沙, Shioso)

3 towns:

- Baiquan (白泉, Bahdzoe)
- Shuangqiao (双桥, Saonjio)
- Ganlan (干𬒗, Kielae)

1 township:

- Beichan (北蝉, Pohzoe)
