= List of ships of World War II (R) =

The List of ships of the Second World War contains major military vessels of the war, arranged alphabetically and by type. The list includes armed vessels that served during the war and in the immediate aftermath, inclusive of localized ongoing combat operations, garrison surrenders, post-surrender occupation, colony re-occupation, troop and prisoner repatriation, to the end of 1945. For smaller vessels, see also list of World War II ships of less than 1000 tons. Some uncompleted Axis ships are included, out of historic interest. Ships are designated to the country under which they operated for the longest period of the Second World War, regardless of where they were built or previous service history. Submarines show submerged displacement.

Click on headers to sort column alphabetically.

List of ships of World War II (R)
Ship	Country or organization	Class	Type	Displacement (tons)	First commissioned	Fate
Racehorse	Royal Navy	R	destroyer	1,705	1942	scrapped 8 December 1949
Raider	Royal Navy	R	destroyer	1,705	1942	paid off January 1946
Raimondo Montecuccoli	Regia Marina	Montecuccoli	light cruiser	3,184	1935	decommissioned 1964
Rainbow	Royal Navy	Rainbow	submarine	2,060	18 January 1932	Sunk 4 October 1940 in collision
Rajah	Royal Navy	Ruler	escort carrier	11,400	17 January 1944	paid off 7 February 1947, scrapped 1975
Rajputana	Royal Navy		armed merchant cruiser	16,568	December 1939	sunk 13 April 1941
Raleigh	United States Navy	Omaha	light cruiser	7,050	6 February 1924	scrapped 1946
Ralph Talbot	United States Navy	Bagley	destroyer	1,500	14 October 1937	scuttled after A-bomb test, 1948
Ramb I	Regia Marina		Armed merchant cruiser	3,667	10 June 1940	sunk 27 February 1941
Ramb II	Regia Marina		Armed merchant cruiser	3,667	10 June 1940	to Japanese as Calitea II, sunk on 12 January 1945
Ramb III	Regia Marina		Armed merchant cruiser	3,667	10 June 1940	to Germany 9 September 1943, then in post-war service with the Yugoslav Navy as Galeb
Ramillies	Royal Navy	Revenge	battleship	29,150	1 September 1917	Decommissioned 31 August 1945, scrapped 1949
Rampur	Royal Indian Navy	Basset	minesweeper	529	1941–1944	1941–1944
Ramsay	United States Navy	Wickes	minelayer destroyer	1,090	15 February 1919	Decommissioned 19 October 1945, scrapped 1947
Randolph	United States Navy	Essex	aircraft carrier	27,100	29 June 1944	decommissioned 13 February 1969, scrapped 1975
Ranee	Royal Navy	Ruler	escort carrier	7,800	2 June 1943	paid off 22 January 1947, scrapped 1973
Ranger	United States Navy	Ranger	aircraft carrier	14,500	4 June 1934	decommissioned 18 October 1946, scrapped 1947
Ranunculus	Royal Navy	Flower	corvette	925	28 July 1941	returned to Royal Navy 1947
Rapana	Royal Navy	Rapana	merchant aircraft carrier	16,000	July 1943	transferred to merchant service post-war; renamed Rotula
Rapid	Royal Navy	R	destroyer	1,705	20 February 1943	sunk as target, 13 September 1981
Ravager	Royal Navy	Ruler	escort carrier	14,630	25 April 1943	paid off February 1946, scrapped 1973
Rawalpindi	Royal Navy		Armed merchant cruiser	16,697	1 October 1939	Sunk 23 November 1939
Razumny	Soviet Navy	Gnevny	destroyer	1,695	November 1941	scrapped 1964
Reaper	Royal Navy	Ruler	escort carrier	7,800	21 February 1944	paid off 2 July 1946, scrapped 1967
Rechinul	Royal Romanian Navy	Rechinul	submarine	585	9 May 1943	captured by the Soviets in August 1944, scrapped after the war
Redmill	Royal Navy	Captain	frigate	1,300	30 November 1943	declared total loss 27 April 1945
Redoubt	Royal Navy	R	destroyer	1,705	1 October 1942	transferred to the Indian Navy as Ranjit, 1949; scrapped 1979
Regent	Royal Navy	Rainbow	submarine	2,060	11 November 1930	Sunk 18 April 1943
Regina	Royal Canadian Navy	Flower	corvette	925	22 January 1942	sunk on 8 August 1944 by U-667
Regulus	Royal Navy	Rainbow	submarine	2,060	7 December 1930	Sunk 6 December 1940
Reid	United States Navy	Mahan	destroyer	1,450	2 November 1936	sunk 11 December 1944
Relentless	Royal Navy	R	destroyer	1,705	30 November 1942	paid off August 1965
Reno	United States Navy	Atlanta	light cruiser	6,000	28 December 1943	decommissioned 1946, scrapped 1962
Renoncule	Free French Naval Forces	Flower	corvette	925	28 July 1941	1947
Renown	Royal Navy	Renown	battlecruiser	32,000	20 September 1916	scrapped 1948
Repulse	Royal Navy	Renown	battlecruiser	32,000	18 August 1916	sunk 10 December 1941
Resolution	Royal Navy	Revenge	battleship	29,150	7 December 1916	scrapped 1949
Restigouche	Royal Canadian Navy	C	destroyer	1,375	15 June 1938	paid off 6 October 1945
Reuben James	United States Navy	Clemson	destroyer	1,200	24 September 1920	sunk by U-552, 31 October 1941
Revenge	Royal Navy	Revenge	battleship	29,150	1 February 1916	scrapped 1948
Rhind	United States Navy	Benham	destroyer	1,500	10 November 1939	scuttled after A-bomb test 1948
Rhododendron	Royal Navy	Flower	corvette	925	18 October 1940	decommissioned 1947; sold 1950; scrapped 1968
Ribble	Royal Navy; Royal Canadian Navy	River	frigate	1,445	1944	to Canada 24 July 1944, paid off 11 June 1945
Richelieu	French Navy; Free French Naval Forces	Richelieu	battleship	35,000	15 July 1940	scrapped 1968
Fairfax	Royal Navy; Royal Canadian Navy; Soviet Navy	Town	destroyer	1,060	26 November 1940	to Canada 1942, to USSR 16 July 1944 as Jivoochyi
Richmond	United States Navy	Omaha	light cruiser	7,050	2 July 1923	scrapped 1946
Rimouski	Royal Canadian Navy	Flower	corvette	925	26 April 1941	paid off 24 July 1945
Rio Grande do Sul	Brazilian Navy	Bahia	light cruiser	3,100	1910	scrapped 1948
Riquelme	Chilean Navy	Serrano	destroyer	1,090		Discarded 1963
Rivadavia	Argentine Navy	Rivadavia	battleship	27,720	27 August 1914	scrapped February 1956
Riviere du Loup	Royal Canadian Navy	Flower modified	corvette	1,015	21 November 1943	2 July 1945
Ro-31	Imperial Japanese Navy	Kaichū V type	training submarine	1,030	10 May 1927	scuttled 5 April 1946
Ro-33	Imperial Japanese Navy	Kaichū VI type	submarine	1,200	7 October 1935	sunk 29 August 1942
Ro-34	Imperial Japanese Navy	Kaichū VI type	submarine	1,200	31 May 1937	sunk 7 April 1943
Ro-35	Imperial Japanese Navy	Kaichū VII type	submarine	1,447	25 March 1943	sunk 25 August 1943
Ro-36	Imperial Japanese Navy	Kaichū VII type	submarine	1,447	27 May 1943	sunk 13 June 1944
Ro-37	Imperial Japanese Navy	Kaichū VII type	submarine	1,447	30 June 1943	sunk 22 January 1944
Ro-38	Imperial Japanese Navy	Kaichū VII type	submarine	1,447	24 July 1943	missing after 19 November 1943
Ro-39	Imperial Japanese Navy	Kaichū VII type	submarine	1,447	12 September 1943	sunk 1 February 1944
Ro-40	Imperial Japanese Navy	Kaichū VII type	submarine	1,447	28 September 1943	sunk 16 February 1944
Ro-41	Imperial Japanese Navy	Kaichū VII type	submarine	1,447	26 November 1943	sunk 23 March 1945
Ro-42	Imperial Japanese Navy	Kaichū VII type	submarine	1,447	31 August 1943	sunk 11 June 1944
Ro-43	Imperial Japanese Navy	Kaichū VII type	submarine	1,447	16 December 1943	sunk 26 February 1945
Ro-44	Imperial Japanese Navy	Kaichū VII type	submarine	1,447	13 September 1943	sunk 16 June 1944
Ro-45	Imperial Japanese Navy	Kaichū VII type	submarine	1,447	11 January 1944	sunk 30 April 1944
Ro-46	Imperial Japanese Navy	Kaichū VII type	submarine	1,447	19 February 1944	missing after 17 April 1945
Ro-47	Imperial Japanese Navy	Kaichū VII type	submarine	1,447	31 January 1944	sunk 26 September 1944
Ro-48	Imperial Japanese Navy	Kaichū VII type	submarine	1,447	31 March 1944	Sunk 19 July 1944
Ro-49	Imperial Japanese Navy	Kaichū VII type	submarine	1,447	19 May 1944	missing after 25 March 1945
Ro-50	Imperial Japanese Navy	Kaichū VII type	submarine	1,447	31 July 1944	scuttled 1 April 1946
Ro-55	Imperial Japanese Navy	Kaichū VII type	submarine	1,447	30 September 1944	sunk 7 February 1945
Ro-56	Imperial Japanese Navy	Kaichū VII type	submarine	1,447	15 November 1944	sunk 9 April 1945
Ro-57	Imperial Japanese Navy	Type L3	training submarine	1,102.7	30 July 1922	scrapped 1946
Ro-58	Imperial Japanese Navy	Type L3	training submarine	1,102.7	25 November 1922	scrapped 1946
Ro-59	Imperial Japanese Navy	Type L3	training submarine	1,102.7	20 March 1923	scrapped 1946
Ro-60	Imperial Japanese Navy	Type L4	submarine	1,301	17 September 1923	wrecked 29 December 1941
Ro-61	Imperial Japanese Navy	Type L4	submarine	1,301	9 February 1924	sunk 31 August 1942
Ro-62	Imperial Japanese Navy	Type L4	submarine	1,301	24 July 1924	scuttled May 1946
Ro-63	Imperial Japanese Navy	Type L4	submarine	1,301	20 December 1924	scuttled May 1946
Ro-64	Imperial Japanese Navy	Type L4	submarine	1,301	30 April 1925	sunk 12 April 1945
Ro-65	Imperial Japanese Navy	Type L4	submarine	1,301	30 June 1926	sunk in diving accident 3 November 1942
Ro-66	Imperial Japanese Navy	Type L4	submarine	1,301	28 July 1927	sunk in collision 17 December 1941
Ro-67	Imperial Japanese Navy	Type L4	submarine	1,301	15 December 1926	scrapped 1946
Ro-68	Imperial Japanese Navy	Type L4	submarine	1,301	29 October 1925	scuttled 30 April 1946
Ro-100	Imperial Japanese Navy	Ko type	coastal submarine	782	23 September 1942	sunk 25 November 1943
Ro-101	Imperial Japanese Navy	Ko type	coastal submarine	782	31 October 1942	sunk 15 September 1943
Ro-102	Imperial Japanese Navy	Ko type	coastal submarine	782	17 November 1942	missing after 9 May 1943
Ro-103	Imperial Japanese Navy	Ko type	coastal submarine	782	21 October 1942	missing after 28 July 1943
Ro-104	Imperial Japanese Navy	Ko type	coastal submarine	782	25 February 1943	sunk 23 May 1944
Ro-105	Imperial Japanese Navy	Ko type	coastal submarine	782	5 March 1943	sunk 31 May 1944
Ro-106	Imperial Japanese Navy	Ko type	coastal submarine	782	26 December 1942	sunk 22 May 1944
Ro-107	Imperial Japanese Navy	Ko type	coastal submarine	782	26 December 1942	missing after 6 July 1943
Ro-108	Imperial Japanese Navy	Ko type	coastal submarine	782	20 April 1943	sunk 26 May 1944
Ro-109	Imperial Japanese Navy	Ko type	coastal submarine	782	30 April 1943	sunk 25 April 1945
Ro-110	Imperial Japanese Navy	Ko type	coastal submarine	782	6 July 1943	Sunk 11 February 1944
Ro-111	Imperial Japanese Navy	Ko type	coastal submarine	782	19 July 1943	sunk 10 June 1944
Ro-112	Imperial Japanese Navy	Ko type	coastal submarine	782	14 September 1943	sunk 11 February 1945
Ro-113	Imperial Japanese Navy	Ko type	coastal submarine	782	12 October 1943	sunk 13 February 1945
Ro-114	Imperial Japanese Navy	Ko type	coastal submarine	782	20 November 1943	sunk 17 June 1944
Ro-115	Imperial Japanese Navy	Ko type	coastal submarine	782	30 November 1943	sunk 1 February 1945
Ro-116	Imperial Japanese Navy	Ko type	coastal submarine	782	21 January 1944	sunk 24 May 1944
Ro-117	Imperial Japanese Navy	Ko type	coastal submarine	782	31 January 1944	sunk 17 June 1944
Ro-500 (ex-U-511)	Imperial Japanese Navy	Type IXC	submarine	1,213	16 September 1943	Scuttled 30 April 1946
Ro-501 (ex-U-1224)	Imperial Japanese Navy	Type IXC/40	submarine	1,237	15 February 1944	Sunk 13 May 1944
Roberts	Royal Navy	Roberts	monitor	8,000	27 October 1941	scrapped June 1965
Rocket	Royal Navy	R	destroyer	1,705	4 August 1943	paid off 11 May 1962
Rockrose	Royal Navy	Flower	corvette	925	4 November 1941	to South Africa as Protea, 1947; sold 1962; scrapped 1967
Rockwood	Royal Navy	Hunt	destroyer	1,050	4 November 1942	constructive loss November 1943, scrapped 1946
Rodman	United States Navy	Gleaves	destroyer	1,630	29 April 1942	to Taiwan 1955, damaged and struck 1969, destroyed for motion picture 1976
Rodney	Royal Navy	Nelson	battleship	34,000	10 November 1927	scrapped 1948
Roe	United States Navy	Sims	destroyer	1,570	5 January 1940	scrapped 1947
Roebuck	Royal Navy	R	destroyer	1,705	10 June 1943	paid off 1962
Roi	United States Navy	Casablanca	escort carrier	7,800	6 July 1944	decommissioned 9 May 1946, scrapped 1947
Roma	Regia Marina	Littorio	battleship	41,000	14 June 1942	sunk 9 September 1943
Rosario	Argentine Navy	Rosario	gunboat	1,055	1909	Sold 4 December 1959
Rose	Royal Norwegian Navy	Flower	corvette	925	31 October 1941	to Norway 31 October 1941, sunk 26 October 1944 by Manners
Rosebay	Royal Navy	Flower modified	corvette	1,015	28 July 1943	paid off 20 March 1946
Roselys	French Navy	Flower	corvette	925	19 September 1941	1947
Rosthern	Royal Canadian Navy	Flower	corvette	925	17 June 1941	paid off 19 July 1945
Rotherham	Royal Navy	R	destroyer	1,705	August 1942	paid off 1945
Rover	Royal Navy	Rainbow	submarine	2,060	29 January 1931	Scrapped 1946
Rowan	United States Navy	Benham	destroyer	1,500	23 September 1939	sunk 11 September 1943
Roxborough	Royal Navy; Royal Canadian Navy; Soviet Navy	Town	destroyer	1,060	23 September 1940	to Canada 1942, to USSR 1 August 1944 as Zhyostky
Royal Mount	Royal Canadian Navy	River	frigate	1,445	25 August 1944	paid off 17 November 1945
Royal Oak	Royal Navy	Revenge	battleship	29,150	1 May 1916	sunk 14 October 1939
Royal Sovereign	Royal Navy; Soviet Navy	Revenge	battleship	29,150	1 February 1916	transferred to USSR as Arkhangelsk 30 May 1944
Rucumilla	Chilean Navy	H	submarine	441	1917	scrapped 1945
Rudyerd Bay	United States Navy	Casablanca	escort carrier	7,800	25 February 1944	decommissioned 11 June 1946, scrapped 1960
Runnymede	Royal Canadian Navy	River	frigate	1,445	14 June 1944	paid off 19 January 1946
Ruler	Royal Navy	Ruler	escort carrier	15,390	22 December 1943	paid off 29 January 1946, scrapped 31 May 1946
Rushmore	United States Navy	Casa Grande	Dock landing ship	7,930	3 July 1944	Sunk as a target 16 April 1993
Russell	United States Navy	Sims	destroyer	1,570	3 November 1939	scrapped 1947
Ryūhō	Imperial Japanese Navy	Ryūhō	light aircraft carrier	13,360	31 March 1934	struck 30 November 1945, scrapped 1946
Ryūjō	Imperial Japanese Navy	Ryūjō	light aircraft carrier	10,600	9 May 1933	sunk 24 August 1942
