= HMS Regent (N41) =

Submarine of the Royal Navy

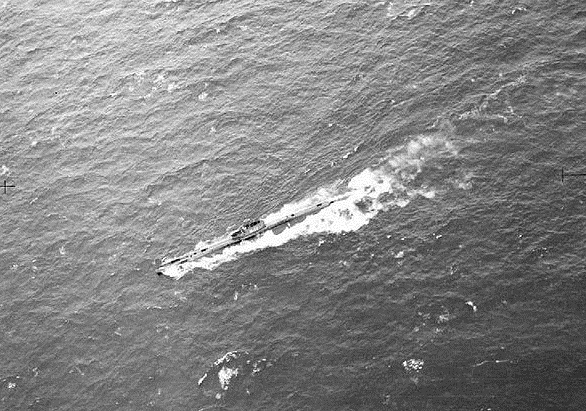

History

United Kingdom
- Name: HMS Regent
- Ordered: 28 February 1929
- Builder: Vickers Shipbuilding and Engineering, Barrow-in-Furness
- Laid down: 19 June 1929
- Launched: 11 June 1930
- Commissioned: 11 November 1930
- Identification: Pennant number: N41
- Fate: Sunk 18 April 1943

General characteristics
- Class & type: Rainbow-class submarine
- Displacement: 1,763 long tons (1,791 t) surfaced; 2,030 long tons (2,060 t) submerged
- Length: 287 ft (87 m)
- Beam: 30 ft (9.1 m)
- Draught: 16 ft (4.9 m)
- Propulsion: Diesel-electric; 2 × Admiralty diesel engines, 4,640 hp (3,460 kW); 2 × electric motors, 1,635 hp (1,219 kW); 2 shafts
- Speed: 17.5 knots (32.4 km/h; 20.1 mph) surfaced; 8.6 knots (15.9 km/h; 9.9 mph) submerged
- Complement: 53
- Armament: 8 × 21-inch (533 mm) torpedo tubes (6 bow, 2 stern) with 14 reloads; 1 × 4.7 in QF Mark IX deck gun

HMS Regent was a Rainbow-class submarine designed and built by Vickers Shipbuilding and Engineering in Barrow-in-Furness for the Royal Navy, and was launched on 11 June 1930. She was lost with all hands after striking a mine on 18 April 1943.

== Construction and career ==
Regent was commissioned for service in the 4th Submarine Flotilla on the China Station. She was deployed at Hong Kong until 1940. There Medway, the Royal Navy's first purpose-built submarine depot ship, supported her and her classmates, Rainbow, Regulus, and Rover. Lieutenant Commander Hugh Browne RN assumed command of Regent on 9 April 1939. Between April and May 1940, Regent and the other boats of the 4th Submarine Flotilla transferred to the 1st Submarine Flotilla, based in Alexandria, Egypt. There she received pennant N41. She initially laid mines off North Africa. From June to December, Regent deployed in the eastern Mediterranean with the 1st Flotilla. While conducting interception patrols, in October Regent sank two merchant vessels off Durazzo, Albania. The vessels had a total tonnage of 6068 tons. One vessel was an Italian sailing vessel, Maria Grazia, of 188 GRT. Regent sank Maria Grazia by ramming her on 5 October off Bari at 41°05′N 17°45′E. Four days later, Regent claimed her second victim, an Italian merchantman of 5,900 GRT. Regent torpedoed Antonietta Costa at 41°05′N 17°45′E. Antonietta Costa managed to run aground, but proved unsalvageable.

On 14 or 15 January 1942, Regent was off Benghazi, Libya. There she sank the MV Città di Messina, with the loss of 432 men. Citta di Messina, of 2,742 tons, was under escort by the Italian torpedo boat Centauro, which was able to rescue 166 survivors. The incident took place 45 nautical miles (83 km) east of Tripoli, Libya, at 32°59′N 14°11′E. On 21 February, Regent attacked three merchant vessels at 33°41′N 12°48′E, which is about 55 nautical miles (102 km) north-northwest of Tripoli, Libya. She damaged the German vessel Menes, of 5,609 tons, but Seatta, one of the three destroyers escorting the merchantmen, took that vessel into tow. Before Saetta took Menes into tow, she dropped depth charges which damaged the submarine.

=== British-Yugoslavian Ambassador Incident ===
The Regent achieved fame after it wove its way in April 1941 through two minefields and entered the Italian port of Kotor, in present-day Montenegro, to negotiate the release of the then British Foreign Minister to Belgrade, Ronald Campbell.

After waiting for nine hours, a Yugoslav commander informed Browne that Yugoslavia had been overrun by German forces and Campbell was being held by the Italians at a small village called Herceg Novi, a short distance down the coast. Regent arrived at Herceg Novi, and Lt. D. Lambert was sent ashore to negotiate Campbell's release. To assuage British fears that the Italians would take Lambert hostage, the Italians exchanged a staff officer. Just after half-past three, several supposed Italian dive bombers attacked Regent. For the safety of his crew, Browne decided he would have to leave Lambert ashore and attempt to escape. The aircraft followed Regent, firing at its periscope, but she successfully escaped into the Adriatic Sea. Although the Regent's crew initially thought the dive bombers were Italian, it later turned out that they were German. Their arrival caused much annoyance to the Italian admiral conducting the negotiations for Campbell's release.

=== Return to combat service ===
Lieutenant Walter Neville Ronald Knox replaced Browne on 20 July 1941. On 1 August, Regent used her gun to sink the Italian auxiliary minesweeper B 23 (Igea), of 160 GRT. The attack took place at 31°33′N 19°56′E, about 33 nautical miles (61 km; 38 mi) south of Benghazi.

In November, the British submarines Regent, Otus, Unique, Ultimatum, Ursula and Urge deployed to interdict convoys sailing between Italy and Tripoli. The group did not meet with any success. Then on 1 December, Regent succeeded in torpedoing the Italian merchant vessel Enrico, of 2,350 GRT. The attack took place at 37°52′N 11°52′E, 10 nmi (19 km; 12 mi) southeast of the Aegadian island of Marettimo.

In January 1942, Regent deployed to Gibraltar, but then sailed to the Philadelphia Naval Shipyard, United States, for a refit, which began on 16 February. (Note: Source: Thomas Heinrich, Associate Professor of American Industrial History, New York, in a personal communication with Lt. Cdr. Geoffrey B. Mason RN (Rtd).) While Regent was on her way via Punta Delgado in the Azores, Clyde fired two torpedoes, fortunately unsuccessfully, at Regent. Both submarines were on the surface; Clyde fired just before she dove. Regent completed her refitting on 18 September. Between 3 December 1942 and 21 January 1943, she reportedly was in Bermuda for repairs of storm damage. She then returned to Gibraltar, where she resumed her deployment in the Mediterranean.

== Loss ==
On 11 April 1943, Regent sailed to patrol the southern Adriatic. She was lost with all hands at some point in April. The loss was discovered when the submarine failed to return to its base in Beirut, Lebanon, to re-fuel and take on supplies by 1 May 1943.

In 2014, Regent's wreckage was believed found at a depth of 28 metres (92 ft) at 41°29′N 16°16′E, some 10 miles (16 km) north of Barletta, on Italy's Adriatic coast. This is now known to be incorrect, the wreck called "Regent" is in fact a small Italian submarine called Bausan, that had its conning tower, propellers and controls removed, and was used as an oil carrying hulk. she was moored up and her position was recorded by the Royal Navy while doing a survey of the area with the view of future amphibious landings. Later she was used as target practice. Her recorded position by the Royal Navy matches the position of the declared Regent wreck. Bausan sank and her wreck incorrectly recorded as HMS Regent.

One theory, which has gained credence, is that on 18 April Regent struck a mine north of Barletta, after attacking an Italian convoy. It was reported that earlier that day an unidentified submarine had attempted to torpedo the small Italian tanker Bivona, of 1,646 GRT, and the submarine in question may have been Regent.

A second theory was that on 18 April the submarine was north of Monopoli, further along the same coast, where she fired a torpedo at the merchant vessel Balcic, but missed. The Italian corvette Gabbiano was escorting Balcic and immediately launched a depth charges attack, which it was thought could have destroyed Regent.

The most likely theory is that on 16 April 1943, she was attacking a railway line with her gun along the Gulf of Taranto. The Italian corvette Gabbiano engaged her and falsely claimed her loss, and Regent entered the Adriatic. On the afternoon of 18 April 1943, she attacked a convoy off Monopoli, her torpedo missed and struck the shore. Later that evening an explosion was heard off Monopoli. She most likely struck a mine. Over the following month, four bodies were found at various places south of Monopoli, three of which wearing Davis escape gear. The bodies were later buried at the Bari war graves cemetery. Two of the head stones say HMS Regent but have the incorrect date of the 16 April 1943.

== Summary of raiding career ==
Date	Name	Nationality	Tonnage (GRT)	Fate
5 October 1940	Maria Grazia	Italy	188	Sunk
9 October 1940	Antonietta Costa	Italy	5,900	Total Loss
15 January 1941	Città di Messina	Italy	2,742	Sunk
21 February 1942	Menes	Nazi Germany	5,609	Damaged
