= David Luce =

Royal Navy Admiral (1906–1971)

Admiral Sir David Luce GCB DSO* OBE
- Admiral Sir David Luce
- Born: 23 January 1906; Malmesbury, Wiltshire
- Died: 6 January 1971 (aged 64); Bath, Somerset
- Relatives: Rear Admiral John Luce (father); Sir William Luce (brother)
- Military career
- Allegiance: United Kingdom
- Branch: Royal Navy
- Service years: 1919–1966
- Rank: Admiral
- Commands: First Sea Lord (1963–1966); Far East Fleet (1960–1962); Scotland and Northern Ireland (1958–1959); Flotillas for the Home Fleet (1956–1958); HMS Birmingham (1952–1953); HMS Liverpool (1951–1952); RNAS Ford (1946–1949); HMS Cachalot (1940–1941); HMS Rainbow (1939–1940); HMS Regulus (1938–1939); HMS H44 (1935–1936)
- Conflicts: Second World War: Dieppe Raid; Invasion of Normandy; Korean War
- Awards: Knight Grand Cross of the Order of the Bath; Companion of the Distinguished Service Order & Bar; Officer of the Order of the British Empire; Mentioned in Despatches; Grand Officer of the Order of Aviz (Portugal); Order of the Two Rivers, Third Class (Iraq)

Admiral Sir John David Luce, GCB, DSO & Bar, OBE (23 January 1906 – 6 January 1971) was a Royal Navy officer. He fought in the Second World War as a submarine commander before taking part in the Dieppe Raid and becoming Chief Staff Officer to the Naval Forces for the Normandy landings. He also commanded a cruiser during the Korean War. He served as First Sea Lord and Chief of the Naval Staff in the mid-1960s and in that role resigned from the Royal Navy along with Navy Minister Christopher Mayhew in March 1966 in protest over the decision by the Labour Secretary of State for Defence, Denis Healey, to cancel the CVA-01 aircraft carrier programme.

== Naval career ==
Born the son of Rear Admiral John Luce and Mary Dorothea Luce (née Tucker), Luce was educated at the Royal Naval College, Dartmouth. He joined the Royal Navy as a cadet in 1919 and, having been promoted to midshipman on 15 January 1924, he went to sea in the battleship HMS Iron Duke.

Promoted to sub-lieutenant on 30 January 1927, Luce trained as a submarine specialist in 1927 and was posted to the submarine HMS L23 in April 1928. Promoted to lieutenant on 16 October 1928, he transferred to the submarine HMS H49 in October 1929. He joined the battleship HMS Queen Elizabeth in the Mediterranean Fleet in December 1930 and became First Lieutenant in the submarine HMS Osiris on the China Station in September 1933. Having attended the Submarine Command Course in Summer 1935, he was given command of the submarine HMS H44 in August 1935. Promoted to lieutenant commander on 16 October 1936, he attended the Royal Naval Staff College in Spring 1937 and then became Staff Officer (Operations) for the 4th Submarine Flotilla on the China Station in January 1938. He was given command of the submarine HMS Regulus in December 1938 and the submarine HMS Rainbow in March 1939.

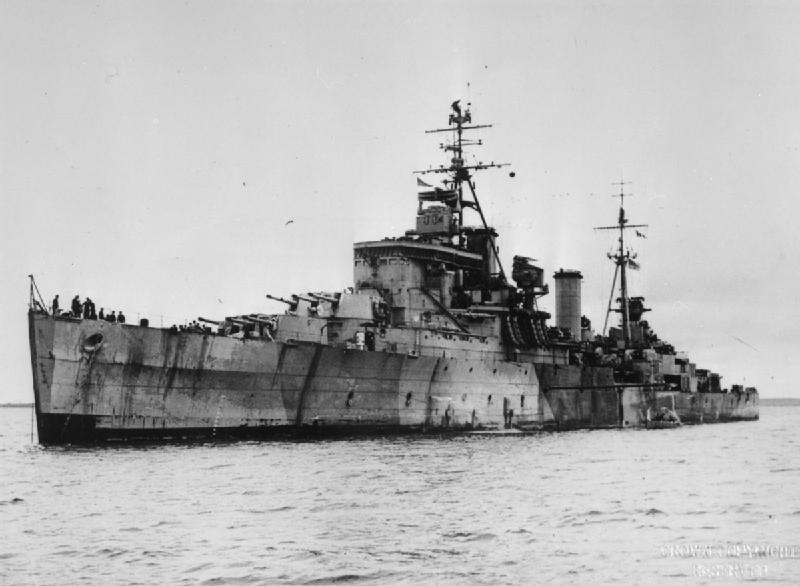
The cruiser HMS Swiftsure in which Luce served as Executive Officer during the Second World War

Luce served in the Second World War, initially in command of the Rainbow and then, from June 1940, in command of the submarine HMS Cachalot. The hazardous patrols he undertook in these submarines led to his being appointed Companion of the Distinguished Service Order (DSO) on 12 November 1940. Promoted to commander on 31 December 1940, he was posted to the Plans Division of the Admiralty in March 1941 and then became Naval Raid planner on the staff of the Naval Adviser at Combined Operations Headquarters. He took part in the Dieppe Raid in August 1942 for which he was appointed an Officer of the Order of the British Empire on 2 October 1942 and was appointed Chief Staff Officer to the Naval Forces for the Normandy landings in June 1944 as a result of which he won a Bar to his DSO on 14 November 1944. He went on to be Executive Officer of the cruiser HMS Swiftsure in the British Pacific Fleet in August 1944 and was promoted to captain on 30 June 1945.

After the war, Luce became Chief of Staff (Operations) to the Commander-in-Chief, British Pacific Fleet. He went on to be Commanding officer of RNAS Ford in September 1946 and became deputy director of Plans at the Admiralty in December 1948. After that he became Commanding Officer of the cruiser HMS Liverpool in 1951 and then commanded the cruiser HMS Birmingham in 1952 in coastal bombardment operations during the Korean War for which he was mentioned in despatches on 19 May 1953.

Luce became Director of the Royal Naval Staff College in March 1953 and was appointed Naval Aide-de-Camp to the Queen on 7 July 1954 before moving on to be Naval Secretary in August 1954. Promoted to rear admiral on 7 January 1955, he became Flag Officer, Flotillas for the Home Fleet in August 1956 and, having been appointed a Companion of the Order of the Bath in the 1957 New Year Honours and promoted to vice admiral on 31 January 1958, he became Flag Officer, Scotland and Northern Ireland in July 1958. Advanced to Knight Commander of the Order of the Bath in the 1960 New Year Honours, he became Commander-in-chief, Far East Fleet in April 1960 and, having received promotion to full admiral on 22 August 1960, he became Commander-in-Chief of British Forces in the Far East and UK Military Adviser to the Southeast Asia Treaty Organization in November 1962. He was advanced to Knight Grand Cross of the Order of the Bath in the 1963 Birthday Honours.

Luce became First Sea Lord and Chief of the Naval Staff in August 1963. He resigned from the Royal Navy along with Navy Minister Christopher Mayhew on 15 March 1966 in protest over the decision by the Labour Secretary of State for Defence, Denis Healey, to cancel the CVA-01 aircraft carrier programme.

== Later career ==
In retirement, Luce became President of the Royal Naval Association. He was appointed an Officer of the Venerable Order of Saint John on 3 January 1969. He died, less than five years after his resignation from the Navy, at Lansdown Nursing Home in Bath, Somerset on 6 January 1971.

== Family ==
In 1935, Luce married Mary Adelaide Norah Whitham; they had two sons. His younger brother, Sir William, was Governor and Commander-in-Chief of Aden (1956–1960). William's son, Richard Luce, Baron Luce, was a Conservative MP (1971–1992), Governor of Gibraltar (1997–2000) and Lord Chamberlain (2000–2006).

Military offices
Preceded by Richard Onslow	Naval Secretary; 1954–1956	Succeeded by Alastair Ewing
Preceded by Sir John Cuthbert	Flag Officer, Scotland and Northern Ireland; 1958–1959	Succeeded by Sir Royston Wright
Preceded by Sir Gerald Gladstone	Commander-in-Chief, Far East Fleet; 1960–1962	Succeeded by Sir Desmond Dreyer
Preceded by Sir Caspar John	First Sea Lord; 1963–1966	Succeeded by Sir Varyl Begg
