= HMS Rainbow =

Nine ships of the Royal Navy have been named HMS Rainbow, after the rainbow, a common meteorological phenomenon:

- English ship Rainbow (1586) was a 26-gun galleon launched in 1586. She was rebuilt in 1602, and again in 1617 to carry 40 guns. She was reconstructed about 1630 as a second rate of 54 guns. She was sunk as a breakwater in 1680.
- HMS Rainbow (1697) was a 32-gun fifth rate captured from the French in 1697 and sold in 1698.
- HMS Rainbow (1747) was a 44-gun fifth rate launched in 1747. She was used as a troopship from 1776, then equipped experimentally with carronades she captured the French frigate Hébé off the coast of Brittany in 1782, was on harbour service from 1784 and was sold in 1802.
- HMS Rainbow (1806) was a 16-gun brig-sloop captured from the French in 1806 and sold in 1807.
- HMS Rainbow (1809) was a 28-gun sixth rate, previously the French ship Iris. She was captured in 1809 by HMS Aimable and was sold in 1815.
- HMS Rainbow (1823) was a 28-gun sixth rate launched in 1823 and sold in 1838.
- HMS Rainbow (1856) was an Albacore-class wood screw gunboat launched in 1856. She was used as a survey vessel from 1857, and a training ship from 1873. She was sold in 1888.
- HMS Rainbow (1891) was an Apollo-class protected cruiser launched in 1891. She was transferred to the Royal Canadian Navy in 1910. The ship was used as a depot ship from 1917 and sold her into civilian service in 1920.
- HMS Rainbow (N16) was a Rainbow-class submarine launched in 1930 and sunk in a collision with the steamer Antonietta Costa in 1940.

== See also ==
- HMCS Rainbow (SS 75) was previously the American Tench-class submarine USS Argonaut. She was transferred to the Royal Canadian Navy in 1968 and was renamed HMCS Rainbow, serving until 1974.
