= HMS Perseus (N36) =

British submarine

Coordinates: 37°54′0″N 20°54′0″E

History

United Kingdom
- Name: HMS Perseus
- Namesake: Perseus
- Builder: Vickers-Armstrongs, Barrow in Furness
- Laid down: 2 July 1928
- Launched: 22 May 1929
- Commissioned: 15 April 1930
- Identification: Pennant number: N36
- Fate: Sunk by mine 6 December 1941

General characteristics
- Class & type: Parthian-class submarine
- Displacement: 1,475 long tons (1,499 t) surfaced; 2,040 long tons (2,073 t) submerged
- Length: 260 ft (79 m)
- Beam: 28 ft (8.5 m)
- Draught: 13 ft 8 in (4.17 m)
- Propulsion: Diesel-electric; 2 Admiralty diesel engines, 4,400 hp (3,300 kW); 2 Electric motors, 1,530 hp (1,140 kW); 2 shafts
- Speed: 17.5 knots (20.1 mph; 32.4 km/h) surfaced; 9 kn (10 mph; 17 km/h) submerged
- Range: 8,500 nmi (15,700 km) at 10 kn (12 mph; 19 km/h)
- Complement: 59
- Armament: 8 × 21 inch (533 mm) torpedo tubes (6 bow, 2 stern); 1 × 4.724 in (120 mm)L40 mark X deck gun in a 50 degree CPXV mounting; 2 × machine guns

HMS Perseus was a British Parthian-class submarine built in 1929 and lost in 1941 during the Second World War. This class was the first to be fitted with Mark VIII torpedoes.

At the start of the war she was operating under the command of Commander Peter Bartlett on the China Station as part of the 4th Submarine Flotilla, together with the other members of her class. This continued until August 1940 when they were reassigned to the Mediterranean, where part of their duties were the ferrying of supplies between Alexandria and the besieged island of Malta. Perseus underwent a refit at Malta from October until April 1941.

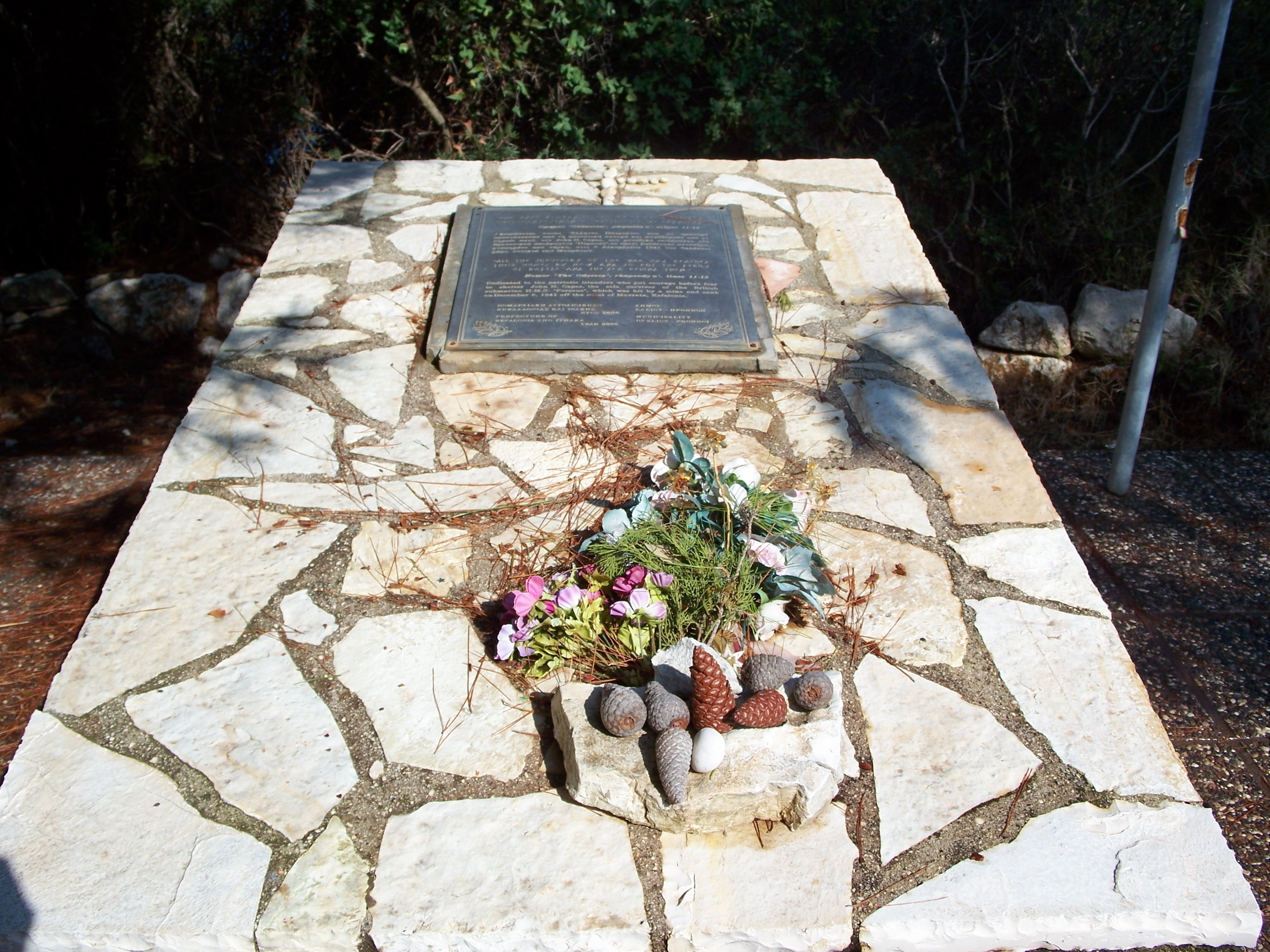
HMS Perseus Memorial, just outside Poros, Kefalonia.

Attached to the 1st Submarine Flotilla based in Alexandria, and under the command of Lieutenant-Commander Edward Christian Frederick Nicolay DSO RN (see Nicolay (family)), she sank the 3,867-ton Italian tanker Maya 5 nautical miles (9 km) south of Tenedos on 5 September 1941, and on 2 October, the 2,086-ton merchant ship Castellon west of Benghazi. It was as a result of these actions that Commander Nicolay was awarded the Distinguished Service Order.

Perseus sailed from Malta for Alexandria on 26 November 1941 with instructions to patrol waters to the east of Greece during her passage. She apparently torpedoed a ship on 3 December, but at 10 pm on 6 December she struck an Italian mine off Cephalonia, 7 miles (11 km) north of Zakynthos in the Ionian Sea.

Of the 61 on board, the only survivor was 31-year-old leading stoker John Capes, one of two non-crew members who were hitching a lift to Alexandria. He and three others escaped from the submarine using the Twill Trunk escape hatch in the engine room and wearing Davis Submerged Escape Apparatus. However, only he survived the journey to the surface and the five-mile (8 km) swim to the island of Cephalonia, where he was hidden by islanders for 18 months before being smuggled in a caïque to İzmir, Turkey. He was subsequently awarded a British Empire Medal.

The wreck, at 52 metres (171 ft) below the surface, was discovered and surveyed in 1997 by a dive team led by Kostas Thoctarides.

The Perseus lies on the seabed with a starboard list. The only significant damage to the vessel is a crack on the port side near the bow, caused by the collision with the mine. The rest of the hull is in good condition. Her gun, her steering wheel, and everything else is in place. Her compasses, which are still working, show her last course. The escape hatch of the stern compartment is open.

Divers found the anchor of an Italian mine close to Perseus; which would appear to have been the cause of her sinking. British authorities had assumed that this was the case, but it had never been confirmed.

On 19 and 20 May 2000, memorial ceremonies were held in Cephalonia in honour of the Perseus' crew. They were attended by relatives of the deceased (including John Capes' daughter), members of the Submarine Old Comrade's Association, locals who hid Capes, and a member of the caique crew who transported Capes to İzmir (amongst others).
