= HMS Proteus (N29) =

Submarine of the Royal Navy

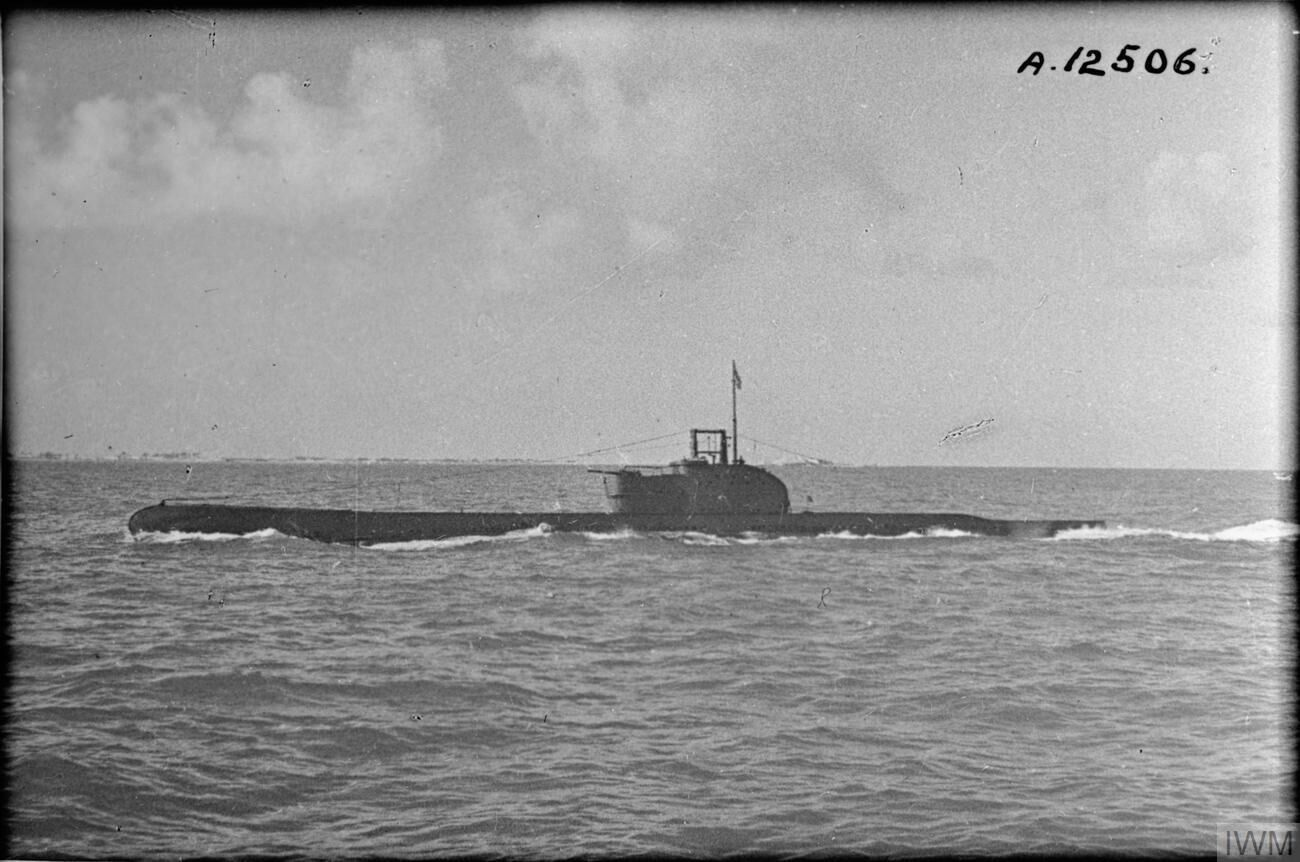
- HMS Proteus (N29)

History

United Kingdom
- Name: HMS Proteus
- Ordered: 7 February 1928
- Builder: Vickers Shipbuilding and Engineering, Barrow-in-Furness
- Laid down: 19 July 1928
- Launched: 22 August 1929
- Completed: 17 June 1930
- Commissioned: 5 May 1930
- Decommissioned: 30 June 1944
- Fate: Scrapped at Troon, Feb-Mar 1946
- Notes: Used for patrol mainly within the Mediterranean Sea.

General characteristics
- Class & type: Parthian-class submarine
- Displacement: 1,788 long tons (1,817 t) surfaced; 2,040 long tons (2,070 t) submerged
- Length: 289 ft (88 m)
- Beam: 30 ft (9.1 m)
- Draught: 15 ft 11 in (4.85 m)
- Propulsion: Diesel-electric; 2 Admiralty diesel engines, 4,400 hp (3,300 kW); 2 Electric motors, 1,530 hp (1,140 kW); 2 shafts
- Speed: 17.5 knots (20.1 mph; 32.4 km/h) surfaced; 9 kn (10 mph; 17 km/h) submerged
- Range: 8,500 nmi (15,700 km) at 10 kn (12 mph; 19 km/h)
- Complement: 53
- Armament: 8 × 21 inch (533 mm) torpedo tubes (6 bow, 2 stern); 1 × 4 in (102 mm) deck gun; 2 × machine guns
- Notes: Pennant number: N29

HMS Proteus was a Parthian-class submarine designed and built by Vickers Shipbuilding and Engineering in Barrow-in-Furness for the Royal Navy. She was laid down on 18 July 1928, launched on 22 August 1929 and completed on 17 June 1930. Like other submarines in her class she served on the China Station before the war. In the Second World War, mainly based at Alexandria in the Mediterranean, Proteus sank 15 enemy vessels and damaged several others during her service.

== Wartime service ==
In July 1939, Proteus began a refit at Singapore Naval Base. After trials, she arrived in Hong Kong in January 1940 where she carried out her first war patrol before being ordered to the Mediterranean on 2 April, arriving in Alexandria on 3 May. On 4 July 1940 in the aftermath of the British attack on Mers-el-Kébir, On 9 August, Proteus was damaged in collision with an Admiralty tug at Malta; local repairs allowed her to complete patrols in the Straights of Messina and the coasts of Calabria and Libya, but in November she was ordered back to Britain for a refit at Portsmouth Naval Base which lasted until July 1941. After trials, Proteus went to Holy Loch where she was fitted with radar equipment, followed by a period of training, trials and exercises.

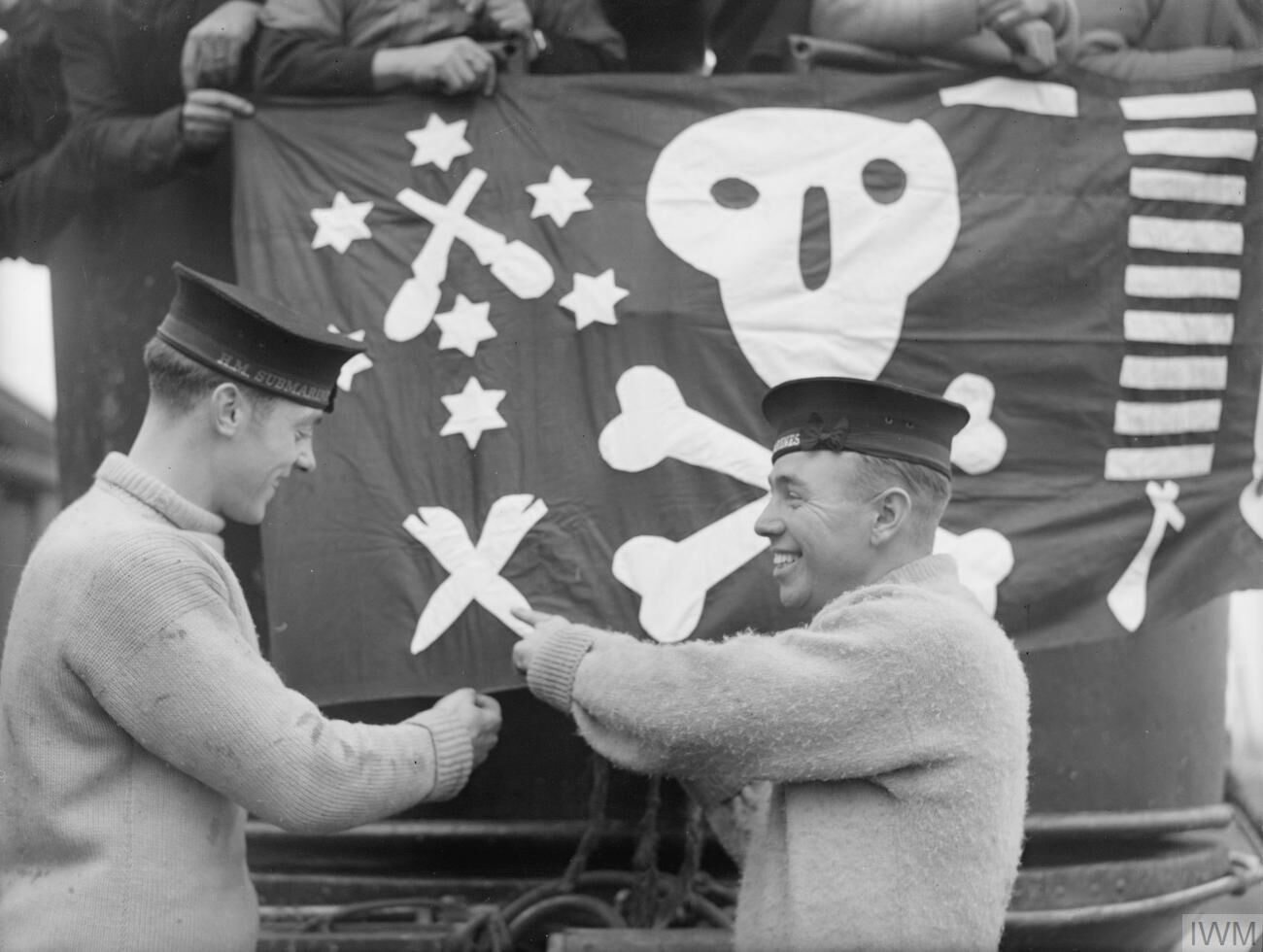
The Jolly Roger flag of Proteus in 1942; the bars symbolise enemy ships sunk by torpedo, the stars denote ships sunk by gunfire, and the crossed can openers record surviving a ramming by an Italian torpedo boat which damaged itself in the process.

In September 1941, Proteus returned to the Mediterranean, operating from Malta in patrols off Greece, before mechanical problems forced a move to Alexandria for repairs. Returning to active patrols in late October, her sinking of the troop transport ship Ithaka on 10 November is thought to be the first radar guided submarine attack. In the early hours of 8 February 1942 off the Greek island of Lefkada, Proteus sighted a dark shape astern, thought initially to be an enemy submarine. After firing with her stern tubes, Proteus turned to fire with her bow tubes, realising too late that it was a surface warship, later identified as the Italian torpedo boat Sagittario, which was on a collision course. Turning towards the ship, Proteus narrowly avoided being rammed, but her extended hydroplane caused a large gash in the torpedo boat's bow plating, the hydroplane was damaged by this ramming so the submarine had to stop her patrol for repair.

After a total of fourteen war patrols in the Mediterranean, the last cut short by engine problems, Proteus was ordered to return to Britain in September 1942. After a lengthy refit at Devonport Naval Base which completed in May 1943, she was assigned to training duties, mainly in the River Clyde area, which continued until she was decommissioned on 30 June 1944.

HMS Proteus was the longest surviving Parthian-class submarine and the only Parthian class submarine to survive the war. Proteus had a total of nine commanders during the war.

Ships sunk by Proteus
Date	Ship	Flag	Tonnage	Notes
10 November 1941	Ithaka	Nazi Germany	1,773 GRT	Troopship; 507 German soldiers of which 469 drowned
8 December 1941	PI 908 / Giorgios	Greece		Caïque
5 January 1942	Città di Palermo	Kingdom of Italy	5,413 GRT	Armed Merchant Cruiser; crew of 150 and 600 troops, 300 rescued
28 March 1942	Galilea	Kingdom of Italy	8,040 GRT	Troopship; 1275 on board, 284 rescued
30 March 1942	Bosforo	Kingdom of Italy	3,648 GRT	Freighter; 103 on board, 90 rescued
5 May 1942	KAL 95 / Evangelistria	Greece	21 GRT	Sailing vessel
30 May 1942	Bravo	Kingdom of Italy	1,570 GRT	Freighter; 41 on board, 39 rescued
31 May 1942	Gino Allegri	Kingdom of Italy	6,836 GRT	Freighter; 21 rescued
4 August 1942	SYR 267 / Marigula	Greece		Caïque
4 August 1942	VOL 239 / Panagia	Greece		Caïque
6 August 1942	Unknown	Greece		Caïque
7 August 1942	PI 948 / Agios Georgios	Greece		Caïque
7 August 1942	Wachtfels	Nazi Germany	8,467 GRT	Freighter
8 August 1942	Unknown	Greece		Caïque

== Bibliography ==
- Akermann, Paul (2002). Encyclopaedia of British Submarines 1901–1955 (reprint of the 1989 ed.). Penzance, Cornwall: Periscope Publishing. ISBN 1-904381-05-7.
- Bagnasco, Erminio (1977). Submarines of World War Two. Annapolis, Maryland: Naval Institute Press. ISBN 0-87021-962-6.
- Caruana, Joseph (2012). "Emergency Victualling of Malta During WWII". Warship International. LXIX (4): 357–364. ISSN 0043-0374.
- Colledge, J. J.; Warlow, Ben (2006) [1969]. Ships of the Royal Navy: The Complete Record of All Fighting Ships of the Royal Navy from the 15th Century to the Present (3rd Rev ed.). London: Chatham Publishing. ISBN 978-1-86176-281-8. OCLC 67375475.
- Chesneau, Roger, ed. (1980). Conway's All the World's Fighting Ships 1922–1946. Greenwich, UK: Conway Maritime Press. ISBN 0-85177-146-7.
- McCartney, Innes (2006). British Submarines 1939–1945. New Vanguard. Vol. 129. Oxford, UK: Osprey. ISBN 1-84603-007-2.
