= Nathaniel Reynolds =

Nathaniel Reynolds (1730 – c. 1782) was a shoemaker, army captain and privateer during the American Revolutionary War. He was the captain of the Blackbird.

== Early career ==
In the town of Beverly, Massachusetts circa 1755, he was a cordwainer.

He participated in the Eddy Rebellion as a captain. He signed the petition to George Washington dated 8/7/1776, a letter of introduction of Jonathan Eddy, Esq. In that position he was involved in the attack of Ft. Cumberland on the Isthmus of Chignecto in Nova Scotia. During that November 1776 adventure, he led the party which took a sloop and aided in the extraction of the families of Eddy's band from Nova Scotia in the County of Cumberland. He attacked loyalists in New Brunswick and, in 1777, engaged with three men of war including the Frigates HMS Rainbow(the 44-gun fifth rate), HMS Mermaid (1761), and HMS Blonde (1760) sent to defeat Colonel Allan's group. During the Battle of Machias, he improvised a privateer given the name "Machias Liberty" and attacked the British ships. The ensuing battle ended inconclusively, and, after a few days, they left the scene and returned to Halifax.

== Privateer ==
Starting in March 1778, he captained the Blackbird, a privateer schooner authorized by the Massachusetts Bay State and owned by Walter Prue Bartlett, Edward Norris, Samuel Page, and Walter P. Bartlett, all of Salem, Massachusetts. It was armed with eight swivel guns. The ship was authorized to attack and disrupt British shipping. In June 1778, he took control of the Hornet, another privateer.

He was lost at sea sometime between January 13, 1782, and September 16, 1786.
