= Hugh Browne (rugby union) =

Irish rugby union player and military officer

Hugh Browne CBE DSO
- Full name: Hugh Christopher Browne
- Born: 28 November 1905 St Giles, London, England
- Died: 6 November 1983 (aged 77) Southampton, Hampshire, England

Rugby union career
- Position: Hooker
International career
Years	Team	Apps	(Points)
1929	Ireland	3	(2)

Hugh Christopher Browne (28 November 1905 — 6 November 1983) was a Royal Navy commander and Ireland international rugby union player of the 1920s.

== Rugby career ==
Born in London, Browne played rugby during his youth and was selected by Ireland after impressing selectors playing for London Irish on a trip to Dublin. He was invited to the Irish trials and made three international appearances as a hooker during the 1929 Five Nations. While based in Edinburgh, Browne played rugby for local side Wanderers. He also competed with the Royal Navy and United Services.

== Military service ==
Browne served with the Royal Navy in World War II and had command of the submarine HMS Regent, noted for its 1941 rescue attempt of the British minister to Yugoslavia Ronald Campbell, after the country fell to Italy. The submarine entered the port of Kotor and withstood enemy attacks from air and land for nine hours, before retreating. For this, Browne was decorated with the Distinguished Service Order (DSO). He had a bar added to the DSO in 1942 and was made a Commander of the Order of the British Empire (CBE) in 1945.

== See also ==
- List of Ireland national rugby union players
