= HMS Rover (N62) =

Submarine of the Royal Navy

- HMS Rover

History

United Kingdom
- Name: Rover
- Ordered: 28 February 1929
- Builder: Vickers Shipbuilding and Engineering, Barrow-in-Furness
- Laid down: 24 July 1929
- Launched: 11 June 1930
- Commissioned: 29 January 1931
- Identification: Pennant number: N62
- Fate: Sold to be scrapped, 30 July 1946. Scrapped at Durban.

General characteristics
- Class & type: Rainbow-class submarine
- Displacement: 1,763 long tons (1,791 t) surfaced; 2,030 long tons (2,060 t) submerged
- Length: 287 ft (87 m)
- Beam: 30 ft (9.1 m)
- Draught: 16 ft (4.9 m)
- Propulsion: Diesel-electric; 2 × Admiralty diesel engines, 4,640 hp (3,460 kW); 2 × electric motors, 1,635 hp (1,219 kW); 2 shafts
- Speed: 17.5 knots (32.4 km/h; 20.1 mph) surfaced; 8.6 knots (15.9 km/h; 9.9 mph) submerged
- Complement: 53
- Armament: 8 × 21-inch (533 mm) torpedo tubes (6 bow, 2 stern) with 14 reloads; 1 × 4.7 in QF Mark IX deck gun

HMS Rover was a Rainbow-class submarine designed and built by Vickers Shipbuilding and Engineering in Barrow-in-Furness for the Royal Navy and was launched on 11 June 1930. During its early career, Rover served in the Far East. During World War II, the submarine operated in the Mediterranean Sea, attacking several Italian convoys and providing assistance to the crippled cruiser HMS York during the evacuation of Crete in 1941, before returning to the Far East to operate against the Japanese. The vessel survived the war and was sold for scrap in 1946.

== Design and construction ==
Ordered by the Royal Navy on 28 February 1929, the submarine was laid down on 24 July 1929 by Vickers Shipbuilding and Engineering, at Barrow-in-Furness. A Rainbow-class vessel, the submarine's sisters were HMS Rainbow, Regent and Regulus, and it was 287 ft (87 m) long, with a beam of 30 ft (9.1 m), and a draught of 16 ft (4.9 m). Carrying a crew of 53 officers and ratings, the submarine displaced 1,763 long tons (1,791 t) surfaced and 2,030 long tons (2,060 t) submerged, and was armed with eight 21-inch (533 mm) torpedo tubes (six in the bow and two in stern) with 14 spare torpedoes for reloads, and one 4.7 in QF Mark IX deck gun. Propulsion was provided by two Admiralty diesel engines, producing 4,640 horsepower (3,460 kW), which were used when the vessel was surfaced, and two electric motors, producing 1,635 hp (1,219 kW) to power the vessel's two shafts when submerged. The vessel was capable of sailing at 17.5 knots (32.4 km/h; 20.1 mph) when surfaced and 8.6 knots (15.9 km/h; 9.9 mph) when submerged. It was launched on 11 June 1930 and construction was completed on 29 January 1931.

== Operational service ==
After being commissioned into the Navy on 29 January 1931, Rover was assigned to the 4th Submarine Flotilla, and deployed to China Station. At the outbreak of World War II, Rover was still part of the 4th Submarine Flotilla, serving east of Suez. The submarine was based at Hong Kong until transferring to Singapore in early 1940. While there, it undertook anti-submarine training with Royal Australian Navy vessels deploying to the Mediterranean. Rover was then stationed in the Mediterranean, moving to Aden in August 1940, and arriving in Alexandria in October. The following month, the submarine began patrol operations and on 9 January 1941 Rover attacked several Italian convoys. During this operation, Rover was damaged by Italian torpedo boats Castore and Cilo, but later damages a sailing vessel with gunfire.

In April 1941, amidst the Battle of Crete, Rover arrived at Souda Bay from Alexandria to assist in an attempt to salvage the disabled the heavy cruiser HMS York, which had been severely damaged by Italian MT boats. Rover was used to provide electrical power to operate anti-aircraft guns during the operation, but on 24 April 1941, the submarine was bombed and had to be towed to Alexandria to receive temporary repairs before being towed to Singapore for more permanent repairs in late 1941. In early 1942, as the Japanese advanced down the Malay Peninsula towards Singapore, Rover was moved to Bombay, in India, where repairs were completed.

At the conclusion of repairs, Rover operated out of Trincomalee, Ceylon, escorting several convoys. According to "United States and Allied submarines successes" she made no attacks during her Far East deployment.{{}} In 1945, Rover took part in anti-submarine training, before being sold to Joubert of Durban.

Rover was the only submarine in her class to survive the war and had a total of six commanders during the war. She was scrapped on 30 July 1946.
