= Japanese submarine Ro-65 =

1925 Ro-60-class submarine

History

Japan
- Name: Ro-65
- Builder: Mitsubishi, Kobe, Japan
- Laid down: 15 November 1924
- Launched: 25 September 1925
- Completed: 30 June 1926
- Commissioned: 30 June 1926
- Decommissioned: 1 April 1931
- Recommissioned: 1 December 1931
- Decommissioned: 15 November 1933
- Recommissioned: 1 November 1934
- Decommissioned: 1 December 1936
- Recommissioned: 20 March 1937
- Decommissioned: 1 December 1937
- Recommissioned: 1939–1940 (see text)
- Fate: Sank 3 November 1942
- Stricken: 1 August 1943

General characteristics
- Class & type: Type L4 (Ro-60-class) submarine
- Displacement: 988 long tons (1,004 t) (surfaced); 1,301 tons (1,322 t) (submerged)
- Length: 78.39 m (257 ft 2 in)
- Beam: 7.41 m (24 ft 4 in)
- Draft: 3.96 m (13 ft 0 in)
- Propulsion: 2 × Vickers diesels, 2 shafts 2,400 bhp (surfaced), 1,600 (submerged)
- Speed: 15.7 knots (29.1 km/h) (surfaced); 8.6 knots (15.9 km/h) (submerged)
- Range: 5,500 nautical miles (10,200 km) at 10 knots (19 km/h) (surfaced); 80 nautical miles (150 km) at 5.7 knots (10.6 km/h) (submerged)
- Test depth: 60 m (200 ft)
- Complement: 48
- Armament: 6 × 533 mm torpedo tubes (6 × bow); 12 × 6th Year Type torpedoes; 1 × 76.2 mm (3.00 in) L/40 naval gun; 1 × 6.5 mm machine gun

Ro-65 was an Imperial Japanese Navy Type L submarine of the L4 subclass. First commissioned in 1926, she served in the waters of Japan prior to World War II. During World War II, she operated in the Central Pacific, supported Japanese forces in the Battle of Wake Island and invasion of Rabaul, and took part in the Aleutian Islands campaign. She sank in a diving accident in November 1942.

== Design and description ==
The submarines of the Type L4 sub-class were copies of the Group 3 subclass of the British L-class submarine built under license in Japan. They were slightly larger and had two more torpedo tubes than the preceding submarines of the L3 subclass. They displaced 1,004 tonnes (988 long tons) surfaced and 1,322 tonnes (1,301 long tons) submerged. The submarines were 78.39 meters (257 ft 2 in) long and had a beam of 7.41 meters (24 ft 4 in) and a draft of 3.96 meters (13 ft 0 in). They had a diving depth of 60 meters (197 ft).

For surface running, the submarines were powered by two 1,200-brake-horsepower (895 kW) Vickers diesel engines, each driving one propeller shaft. When submerged, each propeller was driven by an 800-shaft-horsepower (597 kW) electric motor. They could reach 15.7 knots (29.1 km/h; 18.1 mph) on the surface and 8.6 knots (15.9 km/h; 9.9 mph) underwater. On the surface, they had a range of 5,500 nautical miles (10,200 km; 6,300 mi) at 10 knots (19 km/h; 12 mph); submerged, they had a range of 80 nmi (150 km; 92 mi) at 4 knots (7.4 km/h; 4.6 mph).

The submarines were armed with six internal 533 mm (21 in) torpedo tubes, all in the bow, and carried a total of twelve 6th Year Type torpedoes. They were also armed with a single 76.2 mm (3 in) deck gun and a 6.5 mm machine gun.

== Construction and commissioning ==
Ro-65 was laid down on 15 November 1924 by Mitsubishi at Kobe, Japan. Launched on 25 September 1925, she was completed and commissioned on 30 June 1926.

== Service history ==
=== Pre-World War II ===
Upon commissioning, Ro-65 was attached to the Maizuru Naval District and assigned to Submarine Division 33. On 15 December 1926, she was transferred to the Sasebo Naval District and reassigned to Submarine Division 27 — in which she remained until 1942 — in the Sasebo Defense Division. Submarine Division 27 was reassigned to Submarine Squadron 1 in the 1st Fleet in the Combined Fleet on 15 January 1927, then returned to the Sasebo Defense Division in the Sasebo Naval District on 30 November 1929. On 24 December 1929, the division was reassigned to Submarine Squadron 2 in the 2nd Fleet in the Combined Fleet. It again returned to the Sasebo Defense Division in the Sasebo Naval District on 1 December 1930. Ro-65 was decommissioned and placed in reserve at Sasebo, Japan, on 1 April 1931.

Ro-65 was recommissioned on 1 December 1931, resuming active service in Submarine Division 27 and in the Sasebo Defense Division in the Sasebo Naval District. On 1 October 1932, the division was reassigned to the Sasebo Guard Squadron. On 15 November 1933, the division returned to service in the Sasebo Defense Division, and that day Ro-65 again was decommissioned and placed in reserve at Sasebo.

Ro-65 was recommissioned on 1 November 1934, and returned to service in Submarine Division 27 which by then again was serving in the Sasebo Guard Squadron in the Sasebo Naval District. The division was transferred to the Sasebo Defense Squadron on 15 November 1935. On 1 December 1936, Ro-65 again was decommissioned and placed in reserve at Sasebo. She was recommissioned on 20 March 1937 and rejoined Submarine Division 27 in the Sasebo Guard Guard Squadron, but again was decommissioned on 1 December 1937 and returned to a reserve status. She was placed in Second Reserve in the Sasebo Naval District on 15 December 1938.

Sources offer different accounts of Ro-65′s status during 1939–1940, asserting or implying that she was recommissioned on 1 November 1939, that she remained in Second Reserve until 15 November 1939 and then was in First Reserve until recommissioning on 15 November 1940, and that she recommissioned on 20 March 1940 or on 28 September 1940. Whatever the case, she was back in active service in time for Submarine Division 27's reassignment to Submarine Squadron 7 in the 4th Fleet in the Combined Fleet on 15 November 1940.

When the Imperial Japanese Navy deployed for the upcoming conflict in the Pacific, Ro-65 was at Kwajalein in the Marshall Islands with the other submarines of Submarine Division 27, Ro-66 and Ro-67. She received the message "Climb Mount Niitaka 1208" (Japanese: Niitakayama nobore 1208) from the Combined Fleet on 2 December 1941, indicating that war with the Allies would commence on 8 December 1941 Japan time, which was on 7 December 1941 on the other side of the International Date Line in Hawaii, where Japanese plans called for the war to open with their attack on Pearl Harbor.

=== World War II ===
==== Central Pacific ====
On 5 December 1941, Ro-65 proceeded from Kwajalein to Roi in the Marshall Islands. She departed Roi on 6 December 1941 and made for Wake Island, where the Battle of Wake Island began on 8 December 1941, with Ro-65, Ro-66, and Ro-67 supporting Japanese forces attempting to seize the atoll. United States Marine Corps forces defending Wake drove back the initial Japanese assault that day. While the Japanese gathered reinforcements for a second and larger invasion of the island, Ro-65 conducted her first war patrol, operating off Wake until 13 December 1941. She then returned to Kwajalein, which she reached in company with Ro-67 on 17 December 1941. Ultimately, the Battle of Wake Island concluded on 23 December 1941 with the Japanese conquest of the atoll.

Ro-65 departed Kwajalein on 24 December 1941 to begin her second war patrol, assigned a patrol area in the vicinity of Howland Island and the Phoenix Islands. The patrol was uneventful, and she returned to Kwajalein on 2 January 1942.

On 16 January 1942, Ro-65 got underway in company with Ro-67 to support the Japanese invasion of Rabaul on New Britain in the Admiralty Islands, ordered to patrol south of Cape St. George on New Ireland. On 21 January 1942, the two submarines received orders to join the submarines of Submarine Division 33 — Ro-63, Ro-64, and Ro-68 — in patrolling in St. George's Channel while Japanese forces landed at Rabaul, but they found no targets. Ro-65 arrived at Truk on 29 January 1942.

On 10 February 1942, Submarine Division 27 was disbanded and Ro-65 and Ro-67 were reassigned to Submarine Division 26. The two submarines departed Truk on 18 February 1942 with orders to reconnoiter the Butaritari area in the Gilbert Islands, proceeding to Butaritari after calling at Ponape in the Caroline Islands from 28 February to 3 March 1942. After completing the reconnaissance, the two submarines headed for Japan, calling at Jaluit Atoll in the Marshall Islands from 17 to 18 March 1942 and at Saipan in the Marshall Islands from 24 to 27 March before proceeding to Sasebo, which they reached on 2 April 1942.

==== Aleutian Islands campaign ====
On 14 July 1942, Submarine Division 26 was reassigned to the 5th Fleet for service in the Aleutian Islands, where the Aleutian Islands campaign had begun in June 1942 with the Japanese occupation of Attu and Kiska. On 10 September 1942, Ro-65 and Ro-67 departed Sasebo, then called at Ōminato, Japan, from 13 to 15 September and at Paramushiro in the northern Kurile Islands from 19 to 21 September before proceeding to their new operating base at Kiska, which they reached on 26 September 1942. Almost as soon as they arrived, American aircraft attacked the harbor, inflicting damage on Ro-67 that forced her to head back to Ōminato repairs. Ro-65 stayed on at Kiska, and on 28 September 1942 suffered minor damage to her conning tower when American aircraft strafed her during another air raid.

Ro-65 departed Kiska in company with the submarine Ro-62 with orders to conduct a reconnaissance of Cold Bay on the Alaska Peninsula in the Territory of Alaska. Ro-65 penetrated Cold Bay on 10 October 1942 and returned to Kiska on 15 October 1942.

On 17 October 1942, Ro-65 got underway to rescue the survivors of the destroyer Oboro, which had been sunk in an American air attack that day in the Bering Sea northeast of Kiska at 52°17′N 178°08′E, and to stand by to rescue the crew of the destroyer Hatsuharu — which had suffered heavy damage in the same attack — in case she sank. Ro-65 left her patrol area on 19 October 1942 and on 21 October received orders to conduct a reconnaissance of Holtz Bay on the northeast coast of Attu. She reconnoitered Holtz Bay on 23 October and returned to Kiska on 31 October 1942.

==== Loss ====
Ro-65 was anchored at Kiska on 3 November 1942 when B-24 Liberator bombers of the United States Army Air Forces Eleventh Air Force attacked the harbor. To avoid attack by the approaching bombers, all submarines in the harbor crash-dived as soon as Japanese forces detected the incoming raid. When Ro-65 submerged, her main induction valve and conning tower hatch were still open, and the force of water rushing in shoved her quartermaster aside when he attempted to close the lower hatch to the conning tower. Heavy flooding ensued, drowning 19 members of her crew in her after section as she sank with a 30-degree down angle by the stern, coming to rest with her stern on the harbor bottom. Her 45 survivors escaped through her torpedo tubes, after which her bow section also lost buoyancy and sank to the bottom of the harbor at 51°58′N 177°33′E.

The Japanese struck Ro-65 from the Navy list on 1 August 1943.

== Later events ==
Divers from the United States Navy rescue and salvage ship USS Safeguard (ARS-50) surveyed the wreck of Ro-65 at Kiska in September 1989.

== Bibliography ==
- "Rekishi Gunzō"., History of Pacific War Extra, "Perfect guide, The submarines of the Imperial Japanese Forces", Gakken (Japan), March 2005, ISBN 4-05-603890-2
- The Maru Special, Japanese Naval Vessels No.43 Japanese Submarines III, Ushio Shobō (Japan), September 1980, Book code 68343–44
- The Maru Special, Japanese Naval Vessels No.132 Japanese Submarines I "Revised edition", Ushio Shobō (Japan), February 1988, Book code 68344–36
- The Maru Special, Japanese Naval Vessels No.133 Japanese Submarines II "Revised edition", Ushio Shobō (Japan), March 1988, Book code 68344-37
