= Japanese submarine Ro-66 =

History

Japan
- Name: Ro-66
- Builder: Mitsubishi, Kobe, Japan
- Laid down: 1 December 1925
- Launched: 25 October 1926
- Completed: 28 July 1927
- Commissioned: 28 July 1927
- Decommissioned: 15 November 1930
- Recommissioned: 1 May 1931
- Decommissioned: 15 November 1933
- Recommissioned: 15 November 1934
- Decommissioned: Possibly 15 November 1938 (see text)
- Recommissioned: Possibly 15 November 1940 (see text)
- Fate: Sunk in collision 17 December 1941
- Stricken: 15 January 1942

General characteristics
- Class & type: Type L4 (Ro-60-class) submarine
- Displacement: 988 long tons (1,004 t) (surfaced); 1,301 tons (1,322 t) (submerged)
- Length: 78.39 m (257 ft 2 in)
- Beam: 7.41 m (24 ft 4 in)
- Draft: 3.96 m (13 ft 0 in)
- Propulsion: 2 × Vickers diesels, 2 shafts 2,400 bhp (surfaced), 1,600 (submerged)
- Speed: 15.7 knots (29.1 km/h) (surfaced); 8.6 knots (15.9 km/h) (submerged)
- Range: 5,500 nautical miles (10,200 km) at 10 knots (19 km/h) (surfaced); 80 nautical miles (150 km) at 5.7 knots (10.6 km/h) (submerged)
- Test depth: 60 m (200 ft)
- Complement: 48
- Armament: 6 × 533 mm torpedo tubes (6 × bow); 12 × 6th Year Type torpedoes; 1 × 76.2 mm (3.00 in) L/40 naval gun; 1 × 6.5 mm machine gun

Ro-66 was an Imperial Japanese Navy Type L submarine of the L4 subclass. First commissioned in 1927, she served in the waters of Japan prior to World War II. During World War II, she operated in the Central Pacific and supported Japanese forces in the Battle of Wake Island until she sank after a collision in December 1941.

== Design and description ==
The submarines of the Type L4 sub-class were copies of the Group 3 subclass of the British L-class submarine built under license in Japan. They were slightly larger and had two more torpedo tubes than the preceding submarines of the L3 subclass. They displaced 1,004 tonnes (988 long tons) surfaced and 1,322 tonnes (1,301 long tons) submerged. The submarines were 78.39 meters (257 ft 2 in) long and had a beam of 7.41 meters (24 ft 4 in) and a draft of 3.96 meters (13 ft 0 in). They had a diving depth of 60 meters (197 ft).

For surface running, the submarines were powered by two 1,200-brake-horsepower (895 kW) Vickers diesel engines, each driving one propeller shaft. When submerged, each propeller was driven by an 800-shaft-horsepower (597 kW) electric motor. They could reach 15.7 knots (29.1 km/h; 18.1 mph) on the surface and 8.6 knots (15.9 km/h; 9.9 mph) underwater. On the surface, they had a range of 5,500 nautical miles (10,200 km; 6,300 mi) at 10 knots (19 km/h; 12 mph); submerged, they had a range of 80 nmi (150 km; 92 mi) at 4 knots (7.4 km/h; 4.6 mph).

The submarines were armed with six internal 533 mm (21 in) torpedo tubes, all in the bow, and carried a total of twelve 6th Year Type torpedoes. They were also armed with a single 76.2 mm (3 in) deck gun and a 6.5 mm machine gun.

== Construction and commissioning ==
Ro-66 was laid down on 1 December 1925 by Mitsubishi at Kobe, Japan. Launched on 25 October 1926, she was completed and commissioned on 28 July 1927.

== Service history ==
=== Pre-World War II ===
Upon commissioning, Ro-66 was attached to the Sasebo Naval District and assigned to Submarine Division 27 — in which she spent her entire career — in Submarine Squadron 1 in the 1st Fleet in the Combined Fleet. Submarine Division 27 was reassigned to the Sasebo Defense Division in the Sasebo Naval District on 30 November 1929. On 24 December 1929, the division was reassigned to Submarine Squadron 2 in the 2nd Fleet in the Combined Fleet. Ro-66 was decommissioned and placed in reserve at Sasebo, Japan, on 15 November 1930.

Ro-66 was recommissioned on 1 May 1931, resuming active service in Submarine Division 27, which by then had been reassigned to the Sasebo Defense Division in the Sasebo Naval District. On 1 October 1932, the division was reassigned to the Sasebo Guard Squadron. On 15 November 1933, the division returned to service in the Sasebo Defense Division, and that day Ro-66 again was decommissioned and placed in reserve at Sasebo.

Ro-66 was recommissioned on 15 November 1934, and returned to service in Submarine Division 27 which by then again was serving in the Sasebo Guard Squadron in the Sasebo Naval District. The division was transferred to the Sasebo Defense Squadron on 15 November 1935.

Sources offer different accounts of Ro-66′s status during 1938–1940, implying both that she was in full commission throughout those years and stating that she was out of commission and in reserve — in Second Reserve from 15 December 1938 to 15 November 1939 and then in First Reserve until 15 November 1940 — in the Sasebo Naval District between December 1938 and November 1940. Whatever the case, she was back in active service in time for Submarine Division 27′s reassignment to Submarine Squadron 7 in the 4th Fleet in the Combined Fleet on 15 November 1940.

When the Imperial Japanese Navy deployed for the upcoming conflict in the Pacific, Ro-66 was at Kwajalein in the Marshall Islands with the other submarines of Submarine Division 27, Ro-65 and Ro-67. She received the message "Climb Mount Niitaka 1208" (Japanese: Niitakayama nobore 1208) from the Combined Fleet on 2 December 1941, indicating that war with the Allies would commence on 8 December 1941 Japan time, which was on 7 December 1941 on the other side of the International Date Line in Hawaii, where Japanese plans called for the war to open with their attack on Pearl Harbor.

=== World War II ===
==== Battle of Wake Island ====
On 6 December 1941, Ro-66 got underway from Kwajalein with the commander of Submarine Squadron 27 embarked to conduct a reconnaissance of Wake Island, which the Japanese planned to invade on 8 December 1941, the first day of the war on Wake Island′s side of the International Date Line. The Battle of Wake Island began on 8 December 1941, with Ro-65, Ro-66, and Ro-67 patrolling in the area supporting Japanese forces attempting to seize the atoll. United States Marine Corps forces defending Wake drove back the initial Japanese assault that day.

While the Japanese gathered reinforcements for a second and larger invasion of the island, Submarine Squadron 7 sent orders to all three submarines of Submarine Division 27 on 12 December 1941 directing them to return to Kwajalein. Accordingly, Ro-65 and Ro-67 headed back to Kwajalein, but a radio failure prevented Ro-66 from receiving the orders despite three attempts by Submarine Squadron 7 to contact her. Consequently, she continued to patrol off Wake Island as the submarines of Submarine Division 26 — Ro-60, Ro-61, and Ro-62 — arrived in the area to relieve the departing submarines.

=== Loss ===
Ro-66 was on the surface 25 nautical miles (46 km; 29 mi) southwest of Wake Island — bearing 252 degrees from the atoll — to recharge her batteries in a heavy squall in the predawn darkness of 17 December 1941 when her lookouts suddenly sighted Ro-62, also on the surface and recharging batteries. Both submarines attempted to back off, but it was too late to avoid a collision, and Ro-62 rammed Ro-66 at 20:20 Japan Standard Time. Ro-66 sank at 19°10′N 166°28′E with the loss of 63 lives, including that of the commander of Submarine Division 27. Ro-62 rescued her three survivors, who had been thrown overboard from her bridge by the collision.

The Battle of Wake Island concluded on 23 December 1941 with the Japanese conquest of the atoll. The Japanese struck Ro-66 from the Navy list on 15 January 1942.

== Bibliography ==
- "Rekishi Gunzō"., History of Pacific War Extra, "Perfect guide, The submarines of the Imperial Japanese Forces", Gakken (Japan), March 2005, ISBN 4-05-603890-2
- The Maru Special, Japanese Naval Vessels No.43 Japanese Submarines III, Ushio Shobō (Japan), September 1980, Book code 68343-44
- The Maru Special, Japanese Naval Vessels No.132 Japanese Submarines I "Revised edition", Ushio Shobō (Japan), February 1988, Book code 68344-36
- The Maru Special, Japanese Naval Vessels No.133 Japanese Submarines II "Revised edition", Ushio Shobō (Japan), March 1988, Book code 68344-37
