= Japanese submarine Ro-67 =

Type L, L4 subclass submarine commissioned in 1926 by Imperial Japanese Navy named Ro67

History

Japan
- Name: Ro-67
- Builder: Mitsubishi, Kobe, Japan
- Laid down: 5 March 1925
- Launched: 18 March 1926
- Completed: 15 December 1926
- Commissioned: 15 December 1926
- Decommissioned: 21 February 1934
- Recommissioned: 16 July 1934
- Decommissioned: 1 December 1936
- Recommissioned: 1939–1940 (see text)
- Decommissioned: 20 July 1945
- Stricken: 20 July 1945
- Fate: Scrapped 1946

General characteristics
- Class & type: Type L4 (Ro-60-class) submarine
- Displacement: 988 long tons (1,004 t) (surfaced); 1,301 tons (1,322 t) (submerged)
- Length: 78.39 m (257 ft 2 in)
- Beam: 7.41 m (24 ft 4 in)
- Draft: 3.96 m (13 ft 0 in)
- Propulsion: 2 × Vickers diesels, 2 shafts 2,400 bhp (surfaced), 1,600 (submerged)
- Speed: 15.7 knots (29.1 km/h) (surfaced); 8.6 knots (15.9 km/h) (submerged)
- Range: 5,500 nautical miles (10,200 km) at 10 knots (19 km/h) (surfaced); 80 nautical miles (150 km) at 5.7 knots (10.6 km/h) (submerged)
- Test depth: 60 m (200 ft)
- Complement: 48
- Armament: 6 × 533 mm torpedo tubes (6 × bow); 12 × 6th Year Type torpedoes; 1 × 76.2 mm (3.00 in) L/40 naval gun; 1 × 6.5 mm machine gun

Ro-67 was an Imperial Japanese Navy Type L submarine of the L4 subclass. First commissioned in 1926, she served in the waters of Japan prior to World War II. During World War II, she operated in the Central Pacific, supported Japanese forces in the Battle of Wake Island and invasion of Rabaul, and took part in the Aleutian Islands campaign. She was decommissioned in 1945 and scrapped in 1946.

== Design and description ==
The submarines of the Type L4 sub-class were copies of the Group 3 subclass of the British L-class submarine built under license in Japan. They were slightly larger and had two more torpedo tubes than the preceding submarines of the L3 subclass. They displaced 1,004 tonnes (988 long tons) surfaced and 1,322 tonnes (1,301 long tons) submerged. The submarines were 78.39 meters (257 ft 2 in) long and had a beam of 7.41 meters (24 ft 4 in) and a draft of 3.96 meters (13 ft 0 in). They had a diving depth of 60 meters (197 ft).

For surface running, the submarines were powered by two 1,200-brake-horsepower (895 kW) Vickers diesel engines, each driving one propeller shaft. When submerged, each propeller was driven by an 800-shaft-horsepower (597 kW) electric motor. They could reach 15.7 knots (29.1 km/h; 18.1 mph) on the surface and 8.6 knots (15.9 km/h; 9.9 mph) underwater. On the surface, they had a range of 5,500 nautical miles (10,200 km; 6,300 mi) at 10 knots (19 km/h; 12 mph); submerged, they had a range of 80 nmi (150 km; 92 mi) at 4 knots (7.4 km/h; 4.6 mph).

The submarines were armed with six internal 533 mm (21 in) torpedo tubes, all in the bow, and carried a total of twelve 6th Year Type torpedoes. They were also armed with a single 76.2 mm (3 in) deck gun and a 6.5 mm machine gun.

== Construction and commissioning ==
Ro-67 was laid down on 5 March 1925 by Mitsubishi at Kobe, Japan. Launched on 18 March 1926, she was completed and commissioned on 15 December 1926.

== Service history ==
=== Pre-World War II ===
Upon commissioning, Ro-67 was attached to the Sasebo Naval District and assigned to Submarine Division 27, in which she served until 1942. Submarine Division 27 was reassigned to Submarine Squadron 1 in the 1st Fleet in the Combined Fleet on 15 January 1927, then returned to the Sasebo Defense Division in the Sasebo Naval District on 30 November 1929. On 24 December 1929, the division was reassigned to Submarine Squadron 2 in the 2nd Fleet in the Combined Fleet. It again returned to the Sasebo Defense Division in the Sasebo Naval District on 1 December 1930. The division was reassigned to the Sasebo Guard Squadron on 1 October 1932, then back to the Sasebo Defense Division on 15 November 1933. It began another assignment to the Sasebo Guard Squadron on 15 November 1933. Ro-67 was decommissioned and placed in reserve on 21 February 1934.

Ro-65 was recommissioned on 16 July 1934, resuming active service in Submarine Division 27, which by then again was serving in the Sasebo Guard Squadron in the Sasebo Naval District. The division was transferred to the Sasebo Defense Squadron on 15 November 1935. On 1 December 1936, Ro-67 again was decommissioned and placed in reserve at Sasebo. She was in Second Reserve from 15 December 1938.

Sources present a confusing picture of Ro-67′s status during 1939–1940. She may have been recommissioned on 1 September 1939 or on 15 November 1939, or she may have remained out of commission throughout 1939 and moved from First Reserve to Second Reserve on 15 November 1939. She may have been in commission from 26 July to 30 October 1940 or remained in Second Reserve continuously from 15 November 1939 to 15 November 1940. Whatever the case, she was back in active service in time for Submarine Division 27′s reassignment to Submarine Squadron 7 in the 4th Fleet in the Combined Fleet on 15 November 1940.

When the Imperial Japanese Navy deployed for the upcoming conflict in the Pacific, Ro-65 was at Kwajalein in the Marshall Islands with the other submarines of Submarine Division 27, Ro-65 and Ro-66. She received the message "Climb Mount Niitaka 1208" (Japanese: Niitakayama nobore 1208) from the Combined Fleet on 2 December 1941, indicating that war with the Allies would commence on 8 December 1941 Japan time, which was on 7 December 1941 on the other side of the International Date Line in Hawaii, where Japanese plans called for the war to open with their attack on Pearl Harbor.

=== World War II ===
==== Central Pacific ====
On 6 December 1941, Ro-66 and Ro-67 got underway from Kwajalein to conduct a reconnaissance of Wake Island, which the Japanese planned to invade on 8 December 1941, the first day of the war on Wake Island′s side of the International Date Line, while Ro-65 reconnoitered Roi in the Marshall Islands before joining Ro-66 and Ro-67 off Wake in time for the invasion. The Battle of Wake Island began on 8 December 1941, with Ro-65, Ro-66, and Ro-67 patrolling in the area supporting Japanese forces attempting to seize the atoll. United States Marine Corps forces defending Wake drove back the initial Japanese assault that day. Ro-67 conducted her first war patrol, operating off Wake until 13 December 1941. She then returned to Kwajalein, which she reached in company with Ro-65 on 17 December 1941. Ultimately, the Battle of Wake Island concluded on 23 December 1941 with the Japanese conquest of the atoll.

Ro-67 departed Kwajalein on 24 December 1941 to begin her second war patrol. Engine trouble forced her to turn back, however, and she returned to Kwajalein on 25 December 1941.

On 16 January 1942, Ro-67 got underway in company with Ro-65 to support the Japanese invasion of Rabaul on New Britain in the Admiralty Islands, ordered to patrol south of Cape St. George on New Ireland. On 21 January 1942, the two submarines received orders to join the submarines of Submarine Division 33 — Ro-63, Ro-64, and Ro-68 — in patrolling in St. George's Channel while Japanese forces landed at Rabaul, but they found no targets. Ro-65 and Ro-67 arrived at Truk on 29 January 1942.

On 10 February 1942, Submarine Division 27 was disbanded and Ro-65 and Ro-67 were reassigned to Submarine Division 26. The two submarines departed Truk on 18 February 1942 with orders to reconnoiter the Butaritari area in the Gilbert Islands, proceeding to Butaritari after calling at Ponape in the Caroline Islands from 28 February to 3 March 1942. After completing the reconnaissance, the two submarines headed for Japan, calling at Jaluit Atoll in the Marshall Islands from 17 to 18 March 1942 and at Saipan in the Marshall Islands from 24 to 27 March before proceeding to Sasebo, which they reached on 2 April 1942.

==== Aleutian Islands campaign ====
On 14 July 1942, Submarine Division 26 was reassigned to the 5th Fleet for service in the Aleutian Islands, where the Aleutian Islands campaign had begun in June 1942 with the Japanese occupation of Attu and Kiska. On 10 September 1942, Ro-65 and Ro-67 departed Sasebo, then called at Ōminato, Japan, from 13 to 15 September and at Paramushiro in the northern Kurile Islands from 19 to 21 September before proceeding to their new operating base at Kiska, which they reached on 26 September 1942. Almost as soon as they arrived, American aircraft attacked the harbor. The planes strafed Ro-67 repeatedly and scored near-misses with several bombs, knocking out both of her periscopes and both of her electric motors. The damage forced her to head back to Ōminato for repairs. She arrived at Ōminato on 4 October 1942.

==== Training duties ====
Ro-67 departed Ōminato on 9 October 1942 and arrived at Yokosuka, Japan, on 12 October 1942. On 15 November 1942, Submarine Division 26 was reassigned to the Kure Submarine Squadron, and thereafter Ro-67 served as a training submarine. She was reassigned to Submarine Division 33 in the Kure Submarine Squadron on 1 December 1943.

Ro-67 was in drydock for repairs at the Kure Naval Arsenal at Kure, Japan, on 19 March 1945 when the United States Navy′s Task Force 58 launched the first Allied air strike against the naval arsenal. More than 240 aircraft from the aircraft carriers USS Essex (CV-9), USS Intrepid (CV-11), USS Hornet (CV-12), USS Wasp (CV-18), USS Hancock (CV-19), USS Bennington (CV-20), and USS Belleau Wood (CVL-24) attacked Japanese ships in the harbor at Kure, and American aircraft repeatedly strafed Ro-67, killing 13 members of her crew.

== Final disposition ==
The damage Ro-67 suffered on 19 March 1945 prompted the Japanese to decommission her on 20 July 1945 and strike her from the Navy list the same day. She subsequently served as a floating jetty at Sasebo and surrendered to the Allies after hostilities between Japan and the Allies ended on 15 August 1945. She was scrapped in 1946.

== Bibliography ==
- "Rekishi Gunzō"., History of Pacific War Extra, "Perfect guide, The submarines of the Imperial Japanese Forces", Gakken (Japan), March 2005, ISBN 4-05-603890-2
- The Maru Special, Japanese Naval Vessels No.43 Japanese Submarines III, Ushio Shobō (Japan), September 1980, Book code 68343-44
- The Maru Special, Japanese Naval Vessels No.132 Japanese Submarines I "Revised edition", Ushio Shobō (Japan), February 1988, Book code 68344-36
- The Maru Special, Japanese Naval Vessels No.133 Japanese Submarines II "Revised edition", Ushio Shobō (Japan), March 1988, Book code 68344-37
