= HMS Rainbow (N16) =

Submarine of the Royal Navy

- HMS Rainbow at sea, bow and stern images

History

United Kingdom
- Name: HMS Rainbow
- Ordered: 28 January 1929
- Builder: Chatham Dockyard
- Laid down: 24 July 1929
- Launched: 14 May 1930
- Commissioned: 18 January 1932
- Identification: Pennant number: N16
- Fate: Believed sunk on 4 October 1940

General characteristics
- Class & type: Rainbow-class submarine
- Displacement: 1,763 long tons (1,791 t) surfaced; 2,030 long tons (2,060 t) submerged
- Length: 287 ft (87 m)
- Beam: 30 ft (9.1 m)
- Draught: 16 ft (4.9 m)
- Propulsion: Diesel-electric; 2 × Admiralty diesel engines, 4,640 hp; 2 × electric motors, 1,635 hp; 2 shafts
- Speed: 17.5 knots (32.4 km/h; 20.1 mph) surfaced; 8.6 knots (15.9 km/h; 9.9 mph) submerged
- Complement: 53
- Armament: 8 × 21 inch (533 mm) torpedo tubes (6 bow, 2 stern); 1 × QF 4.7-inch (120 mm) Mark IX deck gun

HMS Rainbow was a Rainbow-class submarine built for the Royal Navy during the 1930s.

== Design and description ==
The Rainbow-class submarines were designed as improved versions of the Parthian class and were intended for long-range operations in the Far East. The submarines had a length of 287 feet 2 inches (87.5 m) overall, a beam of 29 feet 10 inches (9.1 m) and a mean draught of 13 feet 10 inches (4.2 m). They displaced 1,772 long tons (1,800 t) on the surface and 2,030 long tons (2,060 t) submerged. The Rainbow-class submarines had a crew of 56 officers and ratings. They had a diving depth of 300 feet (91.4 m).

For surface running, the boats were powered by two 2,200-brake-horsepower (1,641 kW) diesel engines, each driving one propeller shaft. When submerged each propeller was driven by a 660-horsepower (492 kW) electric motor. They could reach 17.5 knots (32.4 km/h; 20.1 mph) on the surface and 9 knots (17 km/h; 10 mph) underwater. On the surface, the boats had a range of 7,050 nautical miles (13,060 km; 8,110 mi) at 9.2 knots (17.0 km/h; 10.6 mph) and 62 nmi (115 km; 71 mi) at 4 knots (7.4 km/h; 4.6 mph) submerged.

The boats were armed with six 21 in (530 mm) torpedo tubes in the bow and two more in the stern. They carried six reload torpedoes for a grand total of fourteen torpedoes. They were also armed with a QF 4.7-inch (120 mm) Mark IX deck gun.

== Construction and career ==
Rainbow ran aground in the English Channel off Ventnor, Isle of Wight, on 22 January 1932. She was refloated later the same day.

Rainbow served in the Far East until 1940, when she moved to the Mediterranean. She left for a patrol off Calabria on 23 September 1940 and was due to be back in Alexandria on 16 October, she was last heard from on 25 September. She is believed to have been sunk on 4 October in a collision with the Italian merchant ship Antonietta Costa, which reported striking a submerged object at 03:30, followed by a huge underwater explosion while sailing in convoy from Albania on that date.

Until 1988 it was believed that Rainbow had been sunk by the Enrico Toti, but eventually it was determined that HMS Triad (N53) was the submarine that Enrico Toti sank.
