= HMS Regulus (N88) =

Submarine of the Royal Navy

- RN submarine HMS Regulus (N88)

History

United Kingdom
- Name: HMS Regulus
- Builder: Vickers Armstrong, Barrow-in-Furness
- Laid down: 17 July 1929
- Launched: 11 June 1930
- Commissioned: 7 December 1930
- Fate: Sunk 6 December 1940 near Taranto, probably mined

General characteristics
- Class & type: Rainbow-class submarine
- Displacement: 1,763 long tons (1,791 t) surfaced; 2,030 long tons (2,060 t) submerged
- Length: 287 ft (87 m)
- Beam: 30 ft (9.1 m)
- Draught: 16 ft (4.9 m)
- Propulsion: Diesel-electric; 2 × Admiralty diesel engines, 4,640 hp; 2 × electric motors, 1,635 hp; 2 shafts
- Speed: 17.5 knots (20.1 mph; 32.4 km/h) surfaced; 8.6 kn (9.9 mph; 15.9 km/h) submerged
- Complement: 53
- Armament: 8 × 21 inch (533 mm) torpedo tubes (6 bow, 2 stern) with 14 reloads; 1 × QF 4.7 in Mark IX deck gun

HMS Regulus (N88) was a Rainbow-class submarine built for the Royal Navy during the 1930s.

== Design and description ==
The Rainbow-class submarines were designed as improved versions of the Parthian class and were intended for long-range operations in the Far East. The submarines had a length of 287 feet 2 inches (87.5 m) overall, a beam of 29 feet 10 inches (9.1 m) and a mean draught of 13 feet 10 inches (4.2 m). They displaced 1,772 long tons (1,800 t) on the surface and 2,030 long tons (2,060 t) submerged. The Rainbow-class submarines had a crew of 56 officers and ratings. They had a diving depth of 300 feet (91.4 m).

For surface running, the boats were powered by two 2,200-brake-horsepower (1,641 kW) diesel engines, each driving one propeller shaft. When submerged each propeller was driven by a 660-horsepower (492 kW) electric motor. They could reach 17.5 knots (32.4 km/h; 20.1 mph) on the surface and 9 knots (17 km/h; 10 mph) underwater. On the surface, the boats had a range of 7,050 nautical miles (13,060 km; 8,110 mi) at 9.2 knots (17.0 km/h; 10.6 mph) and 62 nmi (115 km; 71 mi) at 4 knots (7.4 km/h; 4.6 mph) submerged.

The boats were armed with six 21 in (530 mm) torpedo tubes in the bow and two more in the stern. They carried six reload torpedoes for a grand total of fourteen torpedoes. They were also armed with a QF 4.7-inch (120 mm) Mark IX deck gun.

== Construction and career ==
Regulus was laid down by Vickers-Armstrong at Barrow-in-Furness and launched in 1930. Before Second World War she was stationed with Submarine Flotilla #4 on the China station, based out of Hong Kong.

In October 1939 Regulus conducted intelligence-gathering operations in the mouth of the Bungo Strait, off the coast of Japan. It covertly observed Imperial Japanese Navy fleet exercises, including Japanese aircraft carrier Ryujo and a brand new Japanese aircraft carrier, likely Hiryu. It had also entered Shibushi Bay and Osaka Bay via the Kitan Strait, producing photographic intelligence.

Regulus (Lt.Cdr. Frederick Basil Currie, RN) left Alexandria to patrol in the southern Adriatic on 23 November 1940. She was lost with her entire crew on 6 December 1940 whilst on patrol off Taranto, Italy. In all probability she hit a mine.
