= Pennant number =

Naval ship identifier in Europe

In the Royal Navy and other navies of Europe and the Commonwealth of Nations, ships are identified by pennant number (an internationalisation of pendant number, which it was called before 1948). Historically, naval ships flew a flag that identified a flotilla or type of vessel. For example, the Royal Navy used a red burgee for torpedo boats and a pennant with an H for torpedo boat destroyers. Adding a number to the type-identifying flag uniquely identified each ship.

In the current system, a letter prefix, called a flag superior, identifies the type of ship, and numerical suffix, called a flag inferior, uniquely identifies an individual ship. Not all pennant numbers have a flag superior.

== Royal Navy systems ==
The Royal Navy first used pennants to distinguish its ships in 1661 with a proclamation that all of his majesty's ships must fly a union pennant. This distinction was further strengthened by a proclamation in 1674 which forbade merchant vessels from flying any pennants.

The system of numbering pennants was adopted prior to the First World War to distinguish between ships with the same or similar names, to reduce the size and improve the security of communications, and to assist recognition when ships of the same class are together.

During the First World War, pennant numbers were changed on a regular basis, with only those for ships in Home waters centrally controlled; those on foreign stations were allocated on a local basis. However, in November 1919 a new navy-wide system was introduced, with the intention that ships should now carry a permanent number. In most cases, plain numbers were given to capital ships and cruisers, and ones with flags-superior to smaller ships. While the numbers allocated to major warships (except for a few older vessels) would generally remain stable into the 1930s, destroyers were subject to further revisions, stability being reached in January 1922. While 1919/1922 numbers were allocated on a fairly systematic basis, later allocations were on the basis of re-allocating numbers made available by the disposal of older vessels. The next major revision took place in the late 1930s, when the volume of new construction was such that insufficient 'spare' numbers were now available for new ships. Accordingly, older cruisers had the flag-superior 'I' added in front of their existing plain numbers; as a result, submarines, which had previously used 'I', were given a new scheme of flags-inferior. Other changes were also made at this time. The next major change took place in 1940, when there was a wholesale set of changes to flags-superior, including the old cruisers changing from 'I' to 'D'.

Traditionally, a pennant number was reported with a full stop "." between the flag superior or inferior and the number, although this practice has gradually been dropped, and inter-war photos after about 1924 tend not to have the full stop painted on the hull. The system was used throughout the navies of the British Empire so that a ship could be transferred from one navy to another without changing its pennant number.

Pennant numbers were originally allocated by individual naval stations and when a ship changed station it would be allocated a new number. The Admiralty took the situation in hand and first compiled a "Naval Pendant List" in 1910, with ships grouped under the distinguishing flag of their type. In addition, ships of the 2nd and 3rd (i.e. reserve) fleets had a second flag superior distinguishing from which naval depot they were crewed: "C" for Chatham, "D" for Devonport, "N" for Nore and "P" for Portsmouth.

A completely new system was adopted in 1948, when flags-superior specific to a type of ship were introduced. For example, cruisers had the flag-superior 'C', destroyers 'D', frigates 'F' and carriers 'R'. In general, the existing numerical part of a ship's number was kept, except where this would lead to duplication (especially in the case of frigates, where 'F' now absorbed the former 'K', 'L' and 'U' lists), in which case the number was increased by 100, 200 or 300, as necessary.

The 1948 system was later taken over by NATO, and a single pennant list set up for all NATO navies, apart from the US and Canada.

During the 1970s, the service stopped painting pennant numbers on submarines on the grounds that, with the arrival of nuclear boats, they spent too little time on the surface, although submarines do continue to be issued numbers.

HMS Lancaster was initially allocated the pennant number F232, until it was realised that in the Royal Navy, form number 232 is the official report for ships that have run aground; sailors being superstitious, it was quickly changed to F229.

=== Second World War ===
==== No flag superior ====
Pendant number 13 was not allocated.

- Capital ships, aircraft carriers, modern cruisers

==== Flags superior ====
Pendant numbers 13 were not allocated to flag superiors. The letters J and K were used with three number combinations due to the number of vessels.

- D — destroyers (until 1940), older capital ships, aircraft carriers, cruisers (from 1940)
- F — destroyers (until 1940) and large auxiliary combatants (from 1940)
- G — destroyers (from 1940)
- H — destroyers
- I — aircraft carriers, cruisers (until 1940), destroyers (from 1940)
- J — minesweepers
- K — corvettes, frigates
- L — escort destroyers, sloops (until 1941)
- M — minelayers
- N — minesweepers
- P — sloops (until 1939), boom defence vessels (until 1940)
- R — destroyers (from 1942), sloops
- T — river gunboats, netlayers
- U — sloops (from 1941)
- W — tugs and salvage vessels
- X — special service vessels
- Z — gate, mooring and boom defence vessels
- 4 — auxiliary anti-aircraft vessels
- FY — fisheries (auxiliary fishing trawlers, drifter etc.)

==== Flags inferior ====
Flags inferior were applied to submarines. Royal Navy submarines of the "H" and "L", and some transferred American vessels, were not issued names, only numbers. In these cases, the pendant number was simply the hull number inverted (i.e. L24 was issued pendant "24L"). For obvious reasons, the inferior "U" was not used so as not to confuse friendly ships with German U-boats. For similar reasons "V" was not used. Pendant numbers 00–10, 13, and those ending in a zero were not allocated to flag inferiors.

- A — allied (Polish ORP Orzeł (85A))
- C ("coastal") — U class (pre-war construction)
- F ("fleet") — River class
- H — H class
- L — L class
- M ("minelayer") — Grampus class.
- P — O class, P class
- R — R class
- S — S-class submarines (pre-war construction)
- T — T-class submarines (pre-war construction)

In 1940, as part of the fleet-wide revision of pennant numbers, all existing submarines were given the flag-superior "N", usually preceding their previous flag-inferior number. "N"-numbers were also applied to new construction and Allied boats before they ran out and "P" numbers applied as follows:

- PXX — U class (wartime construction), V class
- P2XX — S class (wartime construction)
- P3XX — T class
- P4XX — A class
- P5XX — United States Navy lend-lease submarines
- P6XX — commandeered foreign construction
- P7XX — captured enemy submarines

=== Post-1948 ===
After the Second World War, in 1948, the Royal Navy adopted a rationalised "pennant" number system where the flag superior indicated the basic type of ship as follows. "F" and "A" use two or three digits, "L" and "P" up to four. Again, pennant 13 is not used (for instance the helicopter carrier Ocean (L12) was followed by Albion (L14)).

- A — auxiliaries (vessels of the Royal Fleet Auxiliary, Royal Maritime Auxiliary Service, and Royal Navy Auxiliary Service, including depot ships, boom defence vessels, etc.)
- C — cruisers (currently none in service, therefore unused)
- D — destroyers
- F — frigate (former escort destroyers, sloops and corvettes)
- H — shore signal stations (military); survey vessels
- K — miscellaneous vessels (e.g., the helicopter support ship HMS Lofoten or the seabed operations vessels RFA Proteus and HMS Challenger)
- L — amphibious warfare ships
- M — minesweepers
- N — minelayers (currently none in service, therefore unused)
- P — patrol boats
- R — aircraft carriers
- S — submarines
- X — experimental vessels (currently, the only vessel to use this is XV Patrick Blackett which is not a commissioned ship of the Navy but is crewed and run by the Royal Navy)
- Y — yard vessels

=== Flotilla bands ===
==== 1925–1939 ====
From 1925, flotilla leaders were issued with but did not paint on pendant numbers. Instead, a broad band 4 feet (1.2 m) deep was painted round their fore-funnel. Divisional leaders wore a pendant number and had a narrower 2 feet (0.61 m) deep band on the fore-funnel, painted 3 feet (0.91 m) from the top. The Mediterranean Fleet wore black leader bands and the Atlantic – later Home Fleet wore white bands. The flotillas wore combinations of bands on their after funnel to identify them. From 1925 the following bands were worn;

- 1st Destroyer Flotilla — one black band
- 2nd Destroyer Flotilla — two black bands (one red from 1935)
- 3rd Destroyer Flotilla — three black bands
- 4th Destroyer Flotilla — no bands
- 5th Destroyer Flotilla — one white band
- 6th Destroyer Flotilla — two white bands
- 8th Destroyer Flotilla (from 1935) — one black and one white band

==== Second World War ====
When single funnelled destroyers entered the fleet with the J class in 1939 and with an expansion in the number of flotillas, the system was changed accordingly. Single funnelled ships wore a 3 feet (0.91 m) deep band as a flotilla leader. As a divisional leader they had a 2 feet (0.61 m) wide vertical band the same colour as, and extending 6 feet (1.8 m) below, the upper flotilla band. Leaders bands were white for Home Fleet, red for Mediterranean Fleet, and the system of flotilla bands changed to;

- 1st Destroyer Flotilla (Mediterranean) — 1 red, G class
- 2nd Destroyer Flotilla (Mediterranean) — 2 red, H class
- 3rd Destroyer Flotilla (Mediterranean) — 3 red bands, then none, I class
- 4th Destroyer Flotilla (Mediterranean) — none, Tribal class
- 5th Destroyer Flotilla (Mediterranean) — none, K class
- 6th Destroyer Flotilla (Home) — 1 white, Tribal class
- 7th Destroyer Flotilla (Home) — 2 white, J class
- 8th Destroyer Flotilla (Home) — 3 white, F class
- 9th Destroyer Flotilla (Home) — 1 black & 2 white, V and W class
- 10th Destroyer Flotilla (Home) — none, V & W class
- 11th Destroyer Flotilla (Western Approaches) — 1 black over 2 red, V and W class
- 12th Destroyer Flotilla (Rosyth) — 1 white over 1 red, E class
- 13th Destroyer Flotilla (Gibraltar) — 1 white over 2 red, V and W class
- 14th Destroyer Flotilla (Home) — 1 red over 1 black, V and W class
- 15th Destroyer Flotilla (Rosyth) — 1 red over 2 black, V and W class
- 16th Destroyer Flotilla (Portsmouth) — 1 red over 1 white, V and W class
- 17th Destroyer Flotilla (Western Approaches) (from 1940) — 1 red over 2 white, Town class
- 18th Destroyer Flotilla (Channel) — 1 white & 1 black, A class
- 19th Destroyer Flotilla (Dover)— 1 white over 2 black, B class
- 20th Destroyer Flotilla (Portsmouth) — 2 white over 1 black, C class
- 21st Destroyer Flotilla (China Station) — 2 white over 1 red, D class

Flotilla bands were used throughout the war although war-losses, operational requirements, and new construction broke up the homogeneity of the destroyer flotillas. Vessels were deployed as and when they were needed or available, and were often incorporated into mixed "escort groups" containing a range of vessel types such as sloops, corvettes, frigates and escort carriers. A few of the escort groups adopted funnel bands; others (like the B7 escort group) wore letters on their funnels.

==== Post-war ====
Post-war Flotillas were no longer identified by bands, but by large cast metal numbers bolted to the funnels. Flotilla leaders continued to display a large band at the top of the funnel and half leaders would carry a thin black band around the funnel.

=== Deck codes ===
Aircraft carriers and vessels operating aircraft have a deck code painted on the flight deck to aid identification by aircraft attempting to land. This is in a position clearly visible on the approach path. The Royal Navy uses a single letter (typically the first letter of the ship's name) for aircraft carriers and large vessels operating aircraft, and pairs of letters (usually letters from the ship's name) for smaller vessels. The United States Navy, with its larger fleet, uses the numeric part of the hull classification number (a system analogous to pennant numbers). Deck codes used by contemporary major British naval warships include:

- HMS Albion — AN
- HMS Bulwark — BK
- HMS Dauntless — DT
- HMS Ocean — O
- HMS Ark Royal — R
- HMS Invincible — N
- HMS Illustrious — L
- HMS Queen Elizabeth — Q
- HMS Prince of Wales — P
- RFA Argus — AS
- RFA Lyme Bay — YB
- RFA Cardigan Bay — CB
- RFA Mounts Bay — MB

== International pennant numbers ==
Several European NATO and Commonwealth navies agreed to introduce a pennant number system based on that of the Royal Navy. The system guarantees that, amongst those navies and other navies that later joined, all pennant numbers are unique. The United States and Canada do not participate in this system; their ships are identified by unique hull classification symbols.

Participating countries, with their assigned number ranges, include:

- Argentina — (D: 1x, 2x; P: 3x, 4x; S: 2x, 3x; C: x; V: x)
- Australia (formerly incorporated into the Royal Navy system until 1969; now uses a system based on the RN pennant number format and U.S. hull classification symbols)
- Belgium — (A:9xx; F: 9xx; M: 9xx; P:9xx)
- Denmark — (N: 0xx; A/M/P: 5xx; F/S/Y: 3xx; L: 0xx)
- France — (R: 9x; C/D/S: 6xx; F: 7xx; M/P/A: 6xx, 7xx; L: 9xxx)
- Germany — (A: 5x, 51x, 14xx; D: 1xx; F: 2xx; L: 76x; M: 10xx, 26xx; P: 61xx; S: 1xx)
- Greece — (D/P: 0x, 2xx; A/F: 4xx; L/S/M: 1xx)
- Italy — (5xx; D 5xx; F 5xx; P 4xx; 5xxx; A 5xxx; L 9xxx; Y 5xx; S 5xx)
- Kenya
- Malaysia
- New Zealand – (e.g. F111 = HMNZS Te Mana)
- Netherlands (8xx; Y: 8xxx)
- Norway (F/S/M: 3xx; P: 9xx; L: 45xx)
- Portugal (F/M: 4xx; S: 1xx; P: 11xx0)
- Spain (A: xx, F: 0x 1x 2x.., R: 01, 11, L: 0x, 1x.., P: 0x, 1x.., Y: xxx)
- Sri Lanka
- South Africa
- Turkey (D/S: 3xx; F: 2xx; N: 1xx; A/M: 5xx; P: 1xx, 3xx, L: 4xx; Y: 1xxx)
- United Kingdom (R: 0x; D: 0x & 1xx; F: 0x, 1xx, 2xx; S: 0x, 1xx; M: 0x, 1xx, 1xxx, 2xxx; P: 1xx, 2xx, 3xx; L: 0x, 1xx, 3xxx, 4xxx; A: any)

The NATO pennant number system added the Y (for yard) symbol for tugboats, floating cranes, docks and the like.

== International Deck Codes ==
=== Royal Navy ===
The Royal Navy uses a single letter (typically the first letter of the ship's name) for aircraft carriers and large vessels operating aircraft, and pairs of letters (usually, letters from the ship's name) for smaller vessel.

Albion class

- HMS Albion — AN
- HMS Bulwark — BK

River class

- HMS Forth — FH
- HMS Medway — MY
- HMS Trent — TT
- HMS Tamar — TM
- HMS Spey — SP

Daring class

- HMS Daring — DA
- HMS Dauntless — DT
- HMS Diamond — DM
- HMS Dragon — DN
- HMS Defender — DF
- HMS Duncan — DU

Duke class

- HMS Argyll — AY
- HMS Lancaster — LA
- HMS Iron Duke — IR
- HMS Montrose — MR
- HMS Westminster — WM
- HMS Northumberland — NL
- HMS Richmond — RM
- HMS Somerset — SM
- HMS Sutherland — SU
- HMS Kent — KT
- HMS Portland — PD
- HMS St Albans — SB

Invincible class

- HMS Invincible — N
- HMS Illustrious — L
- HMS Ark Royal — R

Queen Elizabeth class

- HMS Queen Elizabeth — Q
- HMS Prince of Wales — P

Bay class

- RFA Cardigan Bay — CB
- RFA Lyme Bay — YB
- RFA Mounts Bay — MB

Tide class

- RFA Tidespring — TS
- RFA Tiderace — TR
- RFA Tidesurge — TU
- RFA Tideforce — TF

Wave class

- RFA Wave Knight — WK
- RFA Wave Ruler — WR

Fort Rosalie class

- RFA Fort Rosalie — FR
- RFA Fort Austin — FA

Individual ships

- RFA Argus — AS
- RFA Fort Victoria — FV

=== Royal Netherlands Navy ===
De Zeven Provinciën class

- HNLMS De Zeven Provinciën — ZP
- HNLMS Tromp — TR
- HNLMS De Ruyter — DR
- HNLMS Evertsen — EV

Holland class

- HNLMS Holland — HL
- HNLMS Zeeland — ZL
- HNLMS Friesland — FR
- HNLMS Groningen — GR

Amphibious support ships

- HNLMS Rotterdam — RD
- HNLMS Johan de Witt — JW
- HNLMS Karel Doorman — KD

=== Royal Canadian Navy ===
Halifax class

- HMCS Halifax — HX
- HMCS Vancouver — VR
- HMCS Ville de Québec — VC
- HMCS Toronto — TO
- HMCS Regina — RA
- HMCS Calgary — CY
- HMCS Montréal — ML
- HMCS Fredericton — FN
- HMCS Winnipeg — WG
- HMCS Charlottetown — CN
- HMCS St. John's — SJ
- HMCS Ottawa (FFH 341) — OA

Harry DeWolf class

- HMCS Harry DeWolf — HF
- HMCS Margaret Brooke — ME
- HMCS Max Bernays — MS
- HMCS William Hall — WL
- HMCS Frédérick Rolette — FE
- HMCS Robert Hampton Grey — RY

(Deck codes of decommissioned ships)

St. Laurent class

- HMCS St. Laurent — ST
- HMCS Saguenay — SY
- HMCS Skeena — SA
- HMCS Ottawa (DDH-229) — OA
- HMCS Margaree — ME
- HMCS Fraser — FR
- HMCS Assiniboine — AE

Annapolis class

- HMCS Annapolis — AS
- HMCS Nipigon — NN

Iroquois class

- HMCS Iroquois — IS
- HMCS Huron — HN
- HMCS Athabaskan — AN
- HMCS Algonquin — AL

HMCS Provider — PR

Protecteur class

- HMCS Protecteur — PT
- HMCS Preserver — PS

=== Egyptian Navy ===
- ENS Anwar El Sadat — AS
- ENS Gamal Abdel Nasser — GN
- ENS Tahya Misr — TM
- ENS El Fateg — FT

=== German Navy ===
Braunschweig class

- Braunschweig — BS
- Magdeburg — MD
- Erfurt — EF
- Oldenburg — OL
- Ludwigshafen am Rhein — LR

Sachsen class

- Sachsen — SN
- Hamburg — HA
- Hessen — HE

Auxiliary ships

- Main — MA
- Mosel — MO

=== French Navy ===
Charles de Gaulle class

- Charles de Gaulle – G

Mistral class

- Tonnerre — TO
- Dixmude — DX
- Mistral — MI

Horizon class

- Forbin — FB
- Chevalier Paul — PL

Aquitaine class

- Aquitaine — QN
- Provence — PC
- Languedoc — LD
- Auvergne — VG
- Bretagne — BT

La Fayette class

- La Fayette — YE
- Surcouf — SF
- Courbet — CO
- Aconit — AT
- Guépratte — GT

=== Royal New Zealand Navy ===
- HMNZS Otago — OTA
- HMNZS Canterbury — CAN

=== Portuguese Navy ===
Vasco da Gama class

- NRP Vasco da Gama — VG
- NRP Corte Real — CR
- NRP Álvares Cabral — AC

Bartolomeu Dias class

- NRP Bartolomeu Dias — BD
- NRP Dom Francisco de Almeida — FA

=== Indonesian Navy ===
The Indonesian Navy uses a three letter deck code only for frigates and LPDs. The letters usually consist of first letter, third letter, and fourth letter (or last letter) of the ship's name

Ahmad Yani class

- KRI Ahmad Yani — AMY
- KRI Oswald Siahaan — OWA
- KRI Karel Satsuit Tubun — KST
- KRI Abdul Halim Perdanakusumah — AHP
- KRI Slamet Riyadi — SRI
- KRI Yos Sudarso — YSO

Martadinata class

- KRI Raden Eddy Martadinata — REM
- KRI I Gusti Ngurah Rai — GNR

Bung Tomo class

- KRI Bung Tomo —BTO
- KRI John Lie — JLI
- KRI Usman Harun — USH

Fatahillah class

- KRI Fatahillah — FTI
- KRI Malayahati — MLH
- KRI Nala — NLA

Makassar class

- KRI Makassar — MKS
- KRI Banda Aceh — BAC
- KRI Surabaya — SBY
- KRI Banjarmasin — BJM
- KRI Semarang — SMR

Cakra class

- KRI Cakra — CKA
- KRI Nanggala — NGA

Nagapasa class

- KRI Nagapasa — NPS
- KRI Ardadedali — ARD
- KRI Alugoro — AGR

Diponegoro class

- KRI Diponegoro – DPN
- KRI Sultan Iskandar Muda - SIM
- KRI Frans Kaisiepo – FKO
- KRI Sultan Hasanuddin – HSN

== See also ==
- Ship prefix
- List of squadrons and flotillas of the Royal Navy
