= Rainbow-class submarine =

Type of British submarines in service before and during WWII

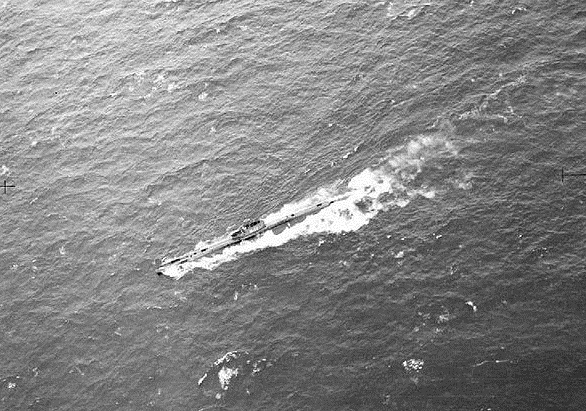
- HMS Regent underway

Class overview
- Name: Rainbow class
- Operators: Royal Navy
- Preceded by: Parthian class
- Succeeded by: S class
- In commission: 1930–1946
- Planned: 6
- Completed: 4
- Canceled: 2
- Lost: 3
- Retired: 1

General characteristics
- Type: Submarine
- Displacement: 1,763 long tons (1,791 t) surfaced; 2,030 long tons (2,063 t) submerged
- Length: 287 ft (87 m)
- Beam: 30 ft (9.1 m)
- Draught: 16 ft (4.9 m)
- Propulsion: Diesel-electric; 2 × Admiralty diesel engines, 4,640 hp (3,460 kW); 2 × electric motors, 1,635 hp (1,219 kW); 2 shafts
- Speed: 17.5 knots (20.1 mph; 32.4 km/h) surfaced; 8.6 kn (9.9 mph; 15.9 km/h) submerged
- Complement: 53
- Armament: 8 × 21 inch (533 mm) torpedo tubes (6 bow, 2 stern) with 14 reloads; 1 × QF 4.7-inch (120 mm) Mark IX deck gun; After 1942 : 2 × 20 mm cannon; Equipped to lay mines through torpedo tubes

The Rainbow-class submarine or R class was a quartet of patrol submarines built for the Royal Navy in the early 1930s.

== Design and description ==
The Rainbow-class submarines were designed as improved versions of the Parthian class and were intended for long-range operations in the Far East. The submarines had a length of 287 feet 2 inches (87.5 m) overall, a beam of 29 feet 10 inches (9.1 m) and a mean draft of 13 feet 10 inches (4.2 m). They displaced 1,772 long tons (1,800 t) on the surface and 2,030 long tons (2,063 t) submerged. The Rainbow-class submarines had a crew of 56 officers and ratings. They had a diving depth of 300 feet (91.4 m).

For surface running, the boats were powered by two 2,200-brake-horsepower (1,641 kW) diesel engines, each driving one propeller shaft. When submerged each propeller was driven by a 660-horsepower (492 kW) electric motor. They could reach 17.5 knots (32.4 km/h; 20.1 mph) on the surface and 9 knots (17 km/h; 10 mph) underwater. On the surface, the boats had a range of 7,050 nautical miles (13,060 km; 8,110 mi) at 9.2 knots (17.0 km/h; 10.6 mph) and 62 nmi (115 km; 71 mi) at 4 knots (7.4 km/h; 4.6 mph) submerged.

The boats were armed with six 21-inch torpedo tubes in the bow and two more in the stern. They carried six reload torpedoes for a grand total of fourteen torpedoes. They were also armed with a QF 4.7-inch (120 mm) Mark IX deck gun.

== Boats ==
Six boats were ordered in February 1929 but, following the May 1929 general election, the new government suspended the construction of two boats in August due to economic considerations; they were subsequently cancelled.

Construction data
Name	Builder	Launched	Fate
Rainbow	Chatham Dockyard	14 May 1930	Sunk 4 October 1940 in collision with the Italian merchant ship Antonietta Costa
Regent	Vickers, Barrow in Furness	11 June 1930	Sunk 18 April 1943 by mines near Barletta, Apulia, Italy
Regulus	Vickers, Barrow in Furness	11 June 1930	Sunk 6 December 1940 by mines near Taranto, Apulia, Italy
Rover	Vickers, Barrow in Furness	11 June 1930	Scrapped 1946
Royalist	Beardmore, Dalmuir		Cancelled 1929
Rupert	Cammell Laird, Birkenhead		Cancelled 1929

It is often stated that the Enrico Toti sank HMS Rainbow. However, the submarine Enrico Toti sank was HMS Triad.
