= Parthian-class submarine =

Type of British submarines in service after WWI and during WWII

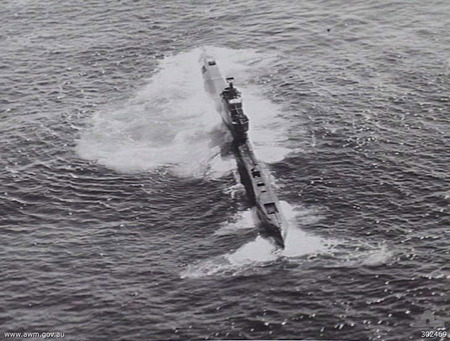
- HMS Phoenix, 1939

Class overview
- Name: Parthian class
- Operators: Royal Navy
- Preceded by: Odin class
- Succeeded by: Rainbow class
- In commission: 1929–1946
- Completed: 6
- Lost: 5

General characteristics
- Type: Submarine
- Displacement: 1,760 long tons (1,788 t) surfaced; 2,040 long tons (2,073 t) submerged
- Length: 289 ft (88 m)
- Beam: 30 ft (9.1 m)
- Draught: 16 ft (4.9 m)
- Propulsion: Diesel-electric; 2 × Admiralty diesel engines, 4,640 hp (3,460 kW); 2 × electric motors, 1,635 hp (1,219 kW); 2 shafts
- Speed: 17.5 knots (20.1 mph; 32.4 km/h) surfaced; 8.6 kn (9.9 mph; 15.9 km/h) submerged
- Complement: 53
- Armament: 8 × 21 in (533 mm) torpedo tubes (6 bow, 2 stern) with 14 reloads; 1 × QF 4 in (102 mm) Mk XII deck gun; After 1942 : 2 × 20 mm Oerlikon cannons; Equipped to lay mines through torpedo tubes

The Parthian-class submarine or P class was a class of six submarines built for the Royal Navy in the late 1920s. They were designed as long-range patrol submarines for the Far East. These boats were almost identical to the Odin class, the only difference being a different bow shape.

== Boats ==
Construction data
Name	Builder	Launched	Fate
Pandora (ex-Python)	Vickers, Barrow	22 August 1929	Sunk by Italian aircraft in harbour at Valletta, Malta, 1 April 1942; Raised but not repaired, September 1943; Hulk scrapped, 1955
Parthian	Chatham Dockyard	22 June 1929	Lost in the Adriatic, presumed mined, 6 August – 11 August 1943
Perseus	Vickers, Barrow	22 May 1929	Mined in the Ionian Sea between the islands of Kefallonia and Zakynthos off the west coast of Greece, 6 December 1941
Phoenix	Cammell Laird	3 October 1929	Presumed sunk in depth charge attack by the Italian torpedo boat Albatros off the coast of Sicily, 16 July 1940
Poseidon	Vickers, Barrow	21 June 1929	Sank in accidental collision with a merchant steamer, 9 June 1931; Wreck alleged to have been salvaged by China during 1970s
Proteus	Vickers, Barrow	23 July 1929	Scrapped at Troon, March 1946

== Bibliography ==
- Akermann, Paul (2002). Encyclopaedia of British Submarines 1901–1955 (reprint of the 1989 ed.). Penzance, Cornwall: Periscope Publishing. ISBN 1-904381-05-7.
- Bagnasco, Erminio (1977). Submarines of World War Two. Annapolis, Maryland: Naval Institute Press. ISBN 0-87021-962-6.
- Caruana, Joseph (2012). "Emergency Victualling of Malta During WWII". Warship International. LXIX (4): 357–364. ISSN 0043-0374.
- Colledge, J. J.; Warlow, Ben (2006) [1969]. Ships of the Royal Navy: The Complete Record of All Fighting Ships of the Royal Navy from the 15th Century to the Present (3rd Rev ed.). London: Chatham Publishing. ISBN 978-1-86176-281-8. OCLC 67375475.
- Chesneau, Roger, ed. (1980). Conway's All the World's Fighting Ships 1922–1946. Greenwich, UK: Conway Maritime Press. ISBN 0-85177-146-7.
- McCartney, Innes (2006). British Submarines 1939–1945. New Vanguard. Vol. 129. Oxford, UK: Osprey. ISBN 1-84603-007-2.
