= HMS Pandora (N42) =

Submarine of the Royal Navy

- HMS Pandora

History

United Kingdom
- Name: HMS Pandora
- Namesake: Pandora
- Ordered: 7 February 1928
- Builder: Vickers-Armstrongs, Barrow in Furness
- Laid down: 9 July 1928
- Launched: 22 August 1929
- Commissioned: 30 June 1930
- Identification: Pennant number: N42
- Fate: Sunk by aircraft, 1 April 1942

General characteristics
- Class & type: Parthian-class submarine
- Displacement: 1,475 long tons (1,499 t) surfaced; 2,040 long tons (2,070 t) submerged
- Length: 260 ft (79 m)
- Beam: 28 ft (8.5 m)
- Draught: 13 ft 8 in (4.17 m)
- Propulsion: Diesel-electric; 2 Admiralty diesel engines, 4,400 hp (3,300 kW); 2 Electric motors, 1,530 hp (1,140 kW); 2 shafts
- Speed: 17.5 knots (32.4 km/h; 20.1 mph) surfaced; 9 knots (17 km/h; 10 mph) submerged
- Range: 8,500 nmi (15,700 km; 9,800 mi) at 10 knots (19 km/h; 12 mph)
- Complement: 59
- Armament: 8 × 21 in (533 mm) torpedo tubes (6 bow, 2 stern); 1 × 4 in (102 mm) deck gun; 2 × machine guns

HMS Pandora was a British Parthian-class submarine commissioned in 1930 and lost in 1942 during the Second World War. This class was the first to be fitted with Mark VIII torpedoes. On 4 July 1940 she torpedoed and sank the French aviso Rigault de Genouilly off the Algerian coast, an act that is still controversial today. In an extension of the Lend-Lease program, Pandora, along with three other British and French submarines, was overhauled at Portsmouth Naval Shipyard in the United States. She was sunk on 1 April 1942 by Junkers Ju 87 aircraft from Sturzkampfgeschwader 3 at the Valletta dockyard, Malta.

== Design ==
The Parthian class was designed as an improvement of the earlier Odin class; the new class was larger, built with a raked stem, and given a shield to cover the 4-inch gun. The class had a design flaw in that the riveted external fuel tanks leaked, leaving an oil trail on the surface.

All submarines of the Parthian class were fitted with eight 21-inch (533 mm) torpedo tubes, one QF 4-inch (102 mm) Mk XII deck gun, and two machine guns. The class was the first to be outfitted with the Mark VIII torpedo. Submarines of the Parthian class were designed for a complement of 53 officers and men.

== History ==
Pandora was ordered on 7 February 1928. She was laid down on 9 July 1928 and built by Vickers-Armstrongs in the port of Barrow-in-Furness. She was launched on 22 August 1929 before being commissioned on 30 June 1930. Pandora was initially named Python; however, her name was changed in 1928 because of a distaste for serpent-named ships in the Royal Navy. (Note: Suspicion of ships named after snakes began with the 1890 loss of HMS Serpent and 173 men. In 1901 Viper and Cobra were lost within 6 weeks of each other. Snake names were not used again by the Royal Navy.) The tenth ship to have this name, Pandora was named after the mythological first woman.

In December 1930, Pandora cruised to China from Portsmouth. She arrived in Hong Kong in February 1931 and served in the China Station from 1931 to 1940. In 1940, Pandora became part of the First Submarine Flotilla along with Parthian, Phoenix, Proteus, Grampus, Rorqual, Odin, Orpheus, Olympus, Otus, Otway, Osiris, and the depot ship Medway.

=== Service in the Second World War ===
Pandora patrolled the Mediterranean from 1940 to 1942. She began her service in the Eastern Mediterranean in June 1940. In July, she was tasked with operations against the French Fleet near Oran off the coast of Algeria. On 4 July 1940, ignoring or having not received the order to stop operations, the commanding officer, despite attacking at short distance, mistook the small French aviso Rigault de Genouilly with a cruiser and sank it near Algiers. During August, Pandora delivered supplies to the blockaded island of Malta.

The Enrico Cosenz attacked Pandora with a depth charge in September, but Pandora survived the attack. In January 1941, she sank three vessels: SS Palma south of Sardinia, SS Valdivagna, and one other ship near Cape Spartivento in Calabria.

== Sinking ==
Pandora arrived in Malta on 31 March 1942 to unload her stores. A bombing raid took place on 1 April 1942 while she was unloading, but the decision was made to continue the process to save time. Pandora took two direct bomb hits and was sunk. The survivors were on board the submarine Olympus when she was destroyed by a naval mine. Of the 98 crew and passengers in Olympus, there were only 9 survivors. In the 1950s, the wreck of Pandora, along with the wrecks of other Malta bombing casualties - P36 and P39, were raised and stripped of their casings and various parts and then taken to sea off Malta and scuttled.
