= HMS Olympus (N35) =

Submarine of the Royal Navy

Coordinates: 35°55′N 14°35′E

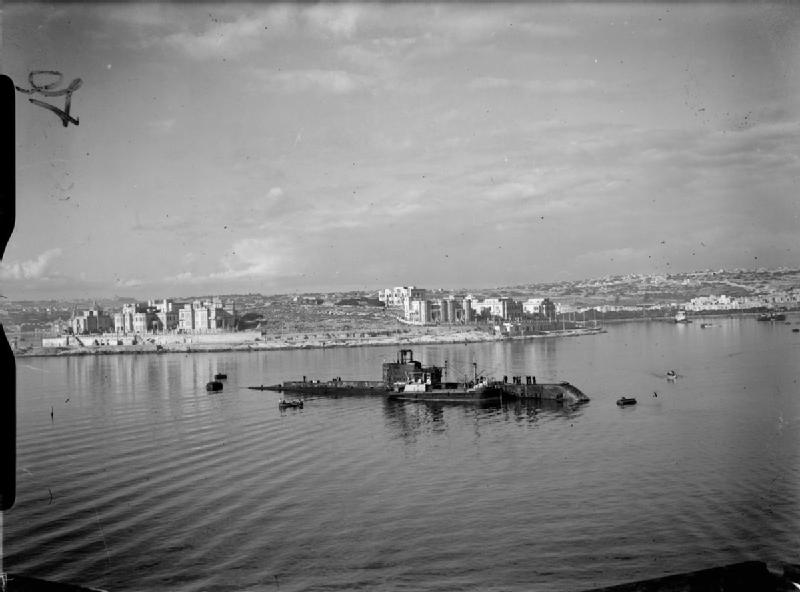
- HMS Olympus taking in supplies in Manoel Creek, Grand Harbour, Malta, December 1941

History

United Kingdom
- Name: HMS Olympus
- Namesake: Olympus
- Builder: William Beardmore and Company
- Laid down: 14 April 1927
- Launched: 11 December 1928
- Commissioned: 14 June 1930
- Identification: Pennant number: N35
- Fate: Sunk by mine off Malta, 8 May 1942
- Badge

General characteristics
- Class & type: Odin-class submarine
- Displacement: 1,781 tons surfaced; 2,038 tons submerged
- Length: 283 ft 8 in (86.5 m)
- Beam: 19 ft 11 in (6.1 m)
- Draught: 16 ft 1 in (4.9 m)
- Propulsion: 2 shaft diesel electric. 4,250 hp Admiralty diesels; Electric motors: 1,390 hp
- Speed: 17.5 knots (32.4 km/h) surfaced; 8 knots (15 km/h) submerged
- Complement: 53-55 officers and men
- Armament: 8 × 21 in (530 mm) (533 mm) torpedo tubes (6 bow, 2 stern); 1 × 4-inch (102 mm) deck gun; 2 × .303 inch AA machine guns

HMS Olympus was an Odin-class submarine, a class originally designed for the Royal Australian Navy to cope with long distance patrolling in Pacific waters. Olympus was built to the same design for the Royal Navy. She served from 1931 to 1939 on the China Station and 1939-1940 out of Colombo. In 1940 she went to the Mediterranean. She was sunk by a mine off Malta in May 1942 killing 89 crew, with 9 survivors.

== Service ==
From 1931 to 1939 Olympus was part of the 4th Flotilla on the China Station. From 1939 to 1940 she was with the 8th Flotilla, Colombo, Ceylon. In 1940 she was redeployed to the Mediterranean. She was damaged on 7 July 1940 when bombed by Italian aircraft while in dock in Malta. Repairs and refit were completed on 29 November 1940. On 9 November 1941 Olympus attacked the Italian merchant ship Mauro Croce (1,049 GRT) with torpedoes and gunfire in the Gulf of Genoa. The target escaped without damage.

On 8 May 1942 Olympus struck a mine and sank off Malta in approximate position 35°55'N, 14°35'E. She had just left Malta on passage to Gibraltar with personnel including many of the crews of the submarines Pandora, P36 and P39 which had been sunk in air raids. There were only 9 survivors out of 98 aboard. Survivors: Herbert Rawlings They had to swim 7 miles (11 km) back to Malta. 89 crew and passengers were lost with the ship.

During the War Olympus was adopted by the Town of Peterborough as part of Warship Week. The plaque from this adoption is held by the National Museum of the Royal Navy in Portsmouth.

== Discovery ==
Sonar scan image of HMS Olympus wreck on the seabed, seven miles off the coast of Malta.

Although a team of divers from the United Kingdom and Malta had claimed discovery of the wreck in 2008, its identity was not confirmed until a team from the Aurora Trust was able to re-locate the wreck in 2011 and capture images with a ROV later in the year. The wreck sits upright in 115m of water and is largely intact.

Malta authorities gave the trust permission to announce the confirmation on 10 January 2012.

== Bibliography ==
- D.K. Brown - Nelson to Vanguard, Chatham Maritime Press ISBN 1-86176-136-8
- Caruana, Joseph (2012). "Emergency Victualling of Malta During WWII". Warship International. LXIX (4): 357–364. ISSN 0043-0374.
