= HMS P39 =

Submarine of the Royal Navy

- HMS P39, 1941/42

History

United Kingdom
- Name: HMS P39
- Builder: Vickers-Armstrongs, Barrow-in-Furness
- Laid down: 14 October 1940
- Launched: 23 August 1941
- Commissioned: 16 November 1941
- Fate: Destroyed in an air raid 26 March 1942

General characteristics
- Class & type: U-class submarine
- Displacement: Surfaced - 540 tons standard, 630 tons full load; Submerged - 730 tons
- Length: 58.22 m (191 feet)
- Beam: 4.90 m (16 ft 1 in)
- Draught: 4.62 m (15 ft 2 in)
- Propulsion: Two shaft diesel-electric; 2 Paxman Ricardo diesel generators + electric motors; 615 / 825 hp
- Speed: 11.25 knots surfaced; 10 knots submerged
- Complement: 27-31
- Armament: Four bow internal 21 inch (533 mm) torpedo tubes; 8 - 10 torpedoes; One 3-inch (76 mm) gun

HMS P39 was a Royal Navy U-class submarine built by Vickers-Armstrongs at Barrow-in-Furness.

== Sinking ==
P39 had a short-lived career with the Royal Navy. She was assigned to operate in the Mediterranean, based in Malta as part of the 10th Flotilla. She was in harbour following a patrol in the area east of Tunisia whilst previous bomb damage was being repaired. She was then further damaged by German bombers. She was considered too badly damaged for repair, and was salvaged, towed to Kalkara and beached in 1943, but again badly damaged by another air attack. Many of the crew were subsequently lost aboard the submarine HMS Olympus on their way home to the United Kingdom. P39 was finally broken up in 1954.
