= HMS P36 (1941) =

Submarine of the Royal Navy

- HMS Ursula, sister ship to HMS P36.

History

United Kingdom
- Name: P36
- Builder: Vickers Armstrong, Barrow-in-Furness
- Laid down: 26 July 1940
- Launched: 28 April 1941
- Commissioned: 24 September 1941
- Fate: Sunk 1 April 1942

General characteristics
- Displacement: Surfaced – 540 tons standard, 630 tons full load; Submerged – 740 tons
- Length: 196 ft 9 in (59.97 m)
- Beam: 16 ft 1 in (4.90 m)
- Draught: 15 ft 2 in (4.62 m)
- Propulsion: 2 shaft diesel-electric; 2 Paxman Ricardo diesel generators + electric motors; 615 / 825 hp
- Speed: 11.25 knots max surfaced; 9 knots (17 km/h) max submerged
- Complement: 27–31
- Armament: 4 bow internal, 2 bow external 21 inch (533 mm) torpedo tubes: 8 – 10 torpedoes; 1 × 3-inch (76 mm) gun; 3 × AA machine guns

HMS P36 was a British U class submarine, a member of the third group of that class to be built. She was sunk at the quayside in Malta in 1942, and some of her survivors were shipwrecked again in another submarine less than six weeks later.

== Service history ==
On 26 November 1941 on patrol in the Bay of Biscay, P36 attacked a German submarine with torpedoes south-west of Belle-Ile island. The torpedoes missed their target which may have been one of U-133, U-552, U-567 or U-577.

On 13 February 1942 P36 fired four torpedoes against the Italian heavy cruisers Gorizia and Trento in the Ionian Sea about 90 nautical miles (170 km) east of Capo Spartivento, Calabria, Italy. None of the torpedoes hit. Two days later, P36 torpedoed and damaged the Italian destroyer Carabiniere off Taranto.

On 1 April 1942 P36 was lying alongside a jetty at Sliema Harbour in Malta when the Luftwaffe attacked the harbour. A large bomb from a Sturzkampfgeschwader 3 aircraft landed sufficiently near to the submarine to hole her and she began to sink. Despite desperate efforts to save the submarine she rolled over and sank. She was not raised until 7 August 1958 and then scuttled off Malta on 22 August 1958. Following the loss of P36 in 1942, some surviving crew members embarked on board another submarine HMS Olympus bound for Gibraltar. Shortly after leaving Malta on 8 May 1942, Olympus struck a mine and sank. The nine survivors of the 98 passengers and crew swam 7 miles (11 km) back to the Maltese coast.
