= Yushan (mountain) =

Highest mountain in Taiwan

Yushan (玉山)
- Jade Mountain
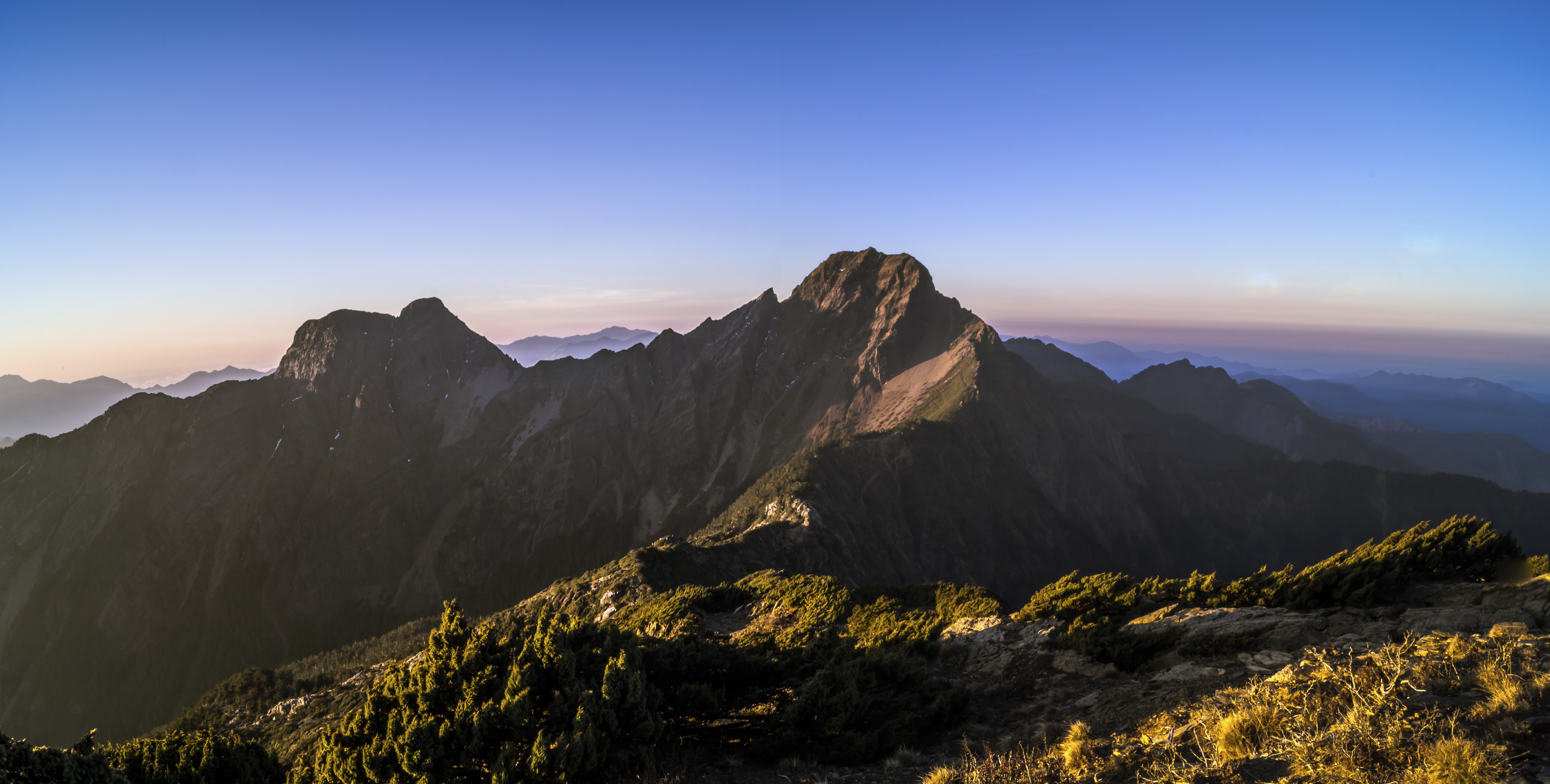
- Yushan from the North Peak

Highest point
- Elevation: 3,952.43 m (12,967.3 ft)
- Prominence: 3,952.43 m (12,967.3 ft); Ranked 27th
- Listing: Country high point Ultra; 100 Peaks of Taiwan
- Coordinates: 23°28′12″N 120°57′26″E

Geography
- Location within Taiwan
- Location: Yushan National Park
- Country: Taiwan
- Administrative subdivision: The border on: Taoyuan District, Kaohsiung; Alishan Township, Chiayi County; Xinyi Township, Nantou County
- Parent range: Yushan Range

Climbing
- First ascent: 1898 by German explorer Karl Theodor Stöpel
- Easiest route: Maintained trail, snow/ice climb during some winter months

Yushan
- Chinese: 玉山
- Postal: Mount Morrison
- Literal meaning: Jade Mountain
Transcriptions
Standard Mandarin
- Hanyu Pinyin: Yùshān
- Gwoyeu Romatzyh: Yuhshan
- Wade–Giles: Yü-shan
Hakka
- Romanization: Ngiu̍k-Sân
Southern Min
- Hokkien POJ: Gio̍k-san

Former names

Batongguan
- Traditional Chinese: 八通關
- Simplified Chinese: 八通关
- Literal meaning: transcribing the Tsou name Patungkuonʉ
Transcriptions
Standard Mandarin
- Hanyu Pinyin: Bātōngguān
- Wade–Giles: Pa-tung-kuan

Baiyushan
- Chinese: 白玉山
- Literal meaning: White Jade Mountain
Transcriptions
Standard Mandarin
- Hanyu Pinyin: Báiyùshān
- Wade–Giles: Bai-yü-shan

Xueshan
- Chinese: 雪山
- Literal meaning: Snowy Mountain
Transcriptions
Standard Mandarin
- Hanyu Pinyin: Xuěshān
- Wade–Giles: Hsueh-shan
- Tongyong Pinyin: Syuěshan
Southern Min
- Hokkien POJ: Seh-soaⁿ

Mugangshan
- Traditional Chinese: 木岡山
- Simplified Chinese: 木冈山
- Literal meaning: Wooded Mountain
Transcriptions
Standard Mandarin
- Hanyu Pinyin: Mùgāngshān
- Wade–Giles: Mu Kang-shan

Mount Niitaka

Chinese name
- Chinese: 新高山
- Literal meaning: New High Mountain
Transcriptions
Standard Mandarin
- Hanyu Pinyin: Xīngāoshān
- Wade–Giles: Hsin-kao Shan

Japanese name
- Kanji: 新高山
- Hiragana: にいたかやま
Transcriptions
- Romanization: Niitakayama

Yu Shan or Yushan, (Note: also calqued as Mount Jade or Jade Mountain) Tongku Saveq, Mount Niitaka (during Japanese rule), is the highest mountain in Taiwan at 3,952 m (12,966 ft) above sea level, giving Taiwan the 4th-highest maximum elevation of any island in the world. It is the highest point in the western Pacific region outside of the Kamchatka Peninsula. Yushan and its surrounding mountains belong to the Yushan Range. The area was once in the ocean; it rose to its current height because of the Eurasian Plate's movement over the Philippine Sea Plate. Yushan is ranked 40th by topographic isolation.

The mountains are now protected as the Yushan National Park. The national park is Taiwan's largest, highest, and least accessible national park. It contains the largest tract of wilderness remaining on the island.

== Names ==
Yushan or Yù Shān is the pinyin romanization of the Chinese name 玉山. It is also known as Mount Yu, Mount Jade, and Jade Mountain, calques of the same name. The name derives from its appearance in the winter, when its thick snow cover is thought to make its peak look like stainless jade. "Yushan" or Jade Mountain was also the name of a location in ancient Chinese mythology, a paradise said to be the home of the Queen Mother of the West.

During the Qing Dynasty, Yushan was known in Chinese as Mugangshan ("Wooded Mountain") from its surrounding forests. Other Chinese names included Batongguan, transcribing its native Tsou name "Patungkuonʉ"; Baiyushan ("White Jade Mountain"); and Xueshan ("Snowy Mountain"). It was previously known in English as Mount Morrison, a name sometimes mistakenly thought to honor the missionary Robert Morrison, but simply the name of an American captain who sighted it.

Other native names for the mountain include Saviah and Tongku Saveq (Bunun; the latter means "highest peak" or "sheltering peak"), Tanungu'incu (Kanakanavu), and Kanasian (Paiwan).

During the Empire of Japan's rule in Taiwan, the mountain became known as Mount Niitaka or Niitakayama ("New High Mountain") because new surveying showed that it was 176 m (577 ft) higher than Mount Fuji in the Japanese archipelago.

== Geography and geology ==
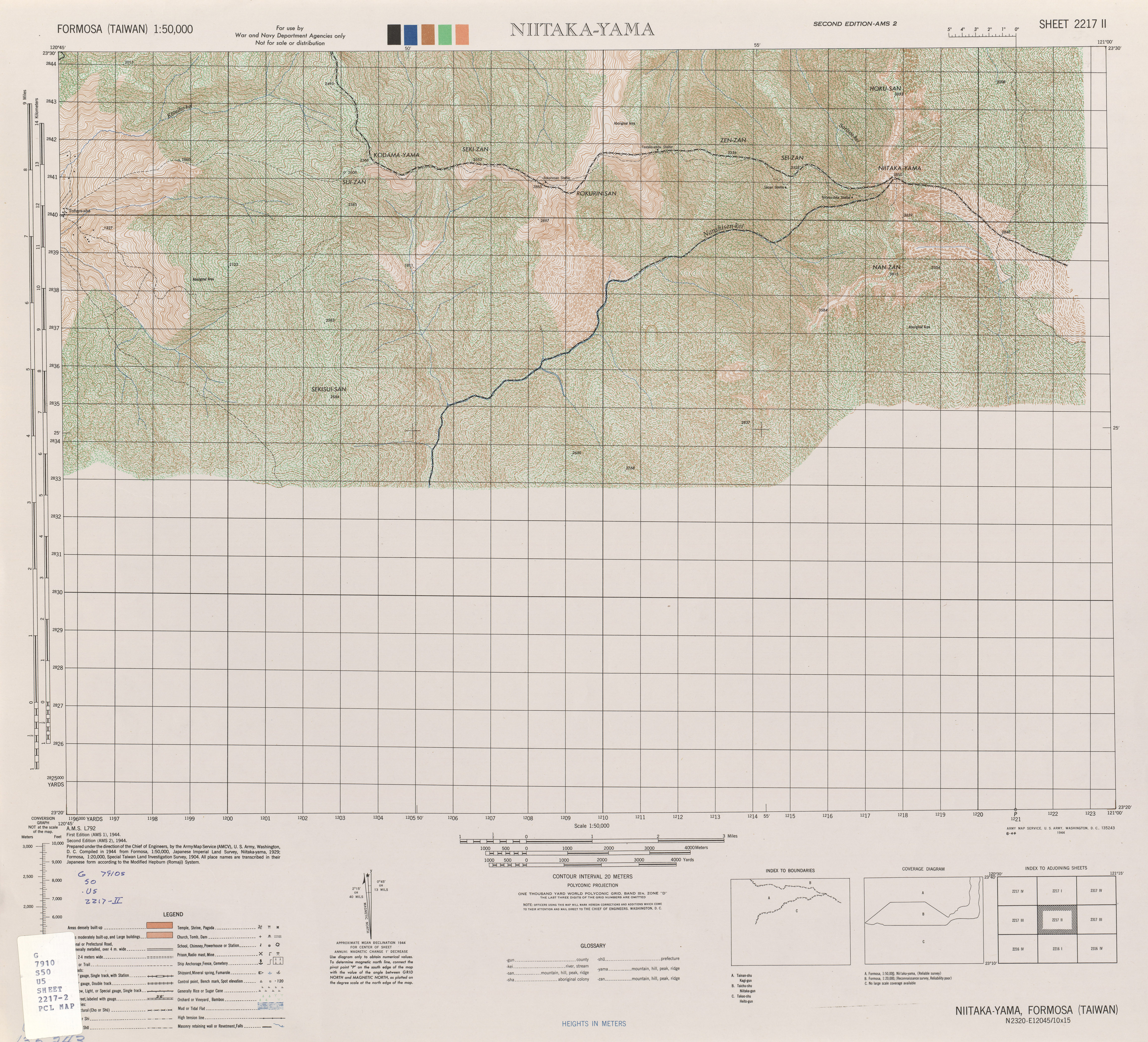
Map of Yu Shan (labeled as NIITAKA-YAMA) and surrounding area (1944)

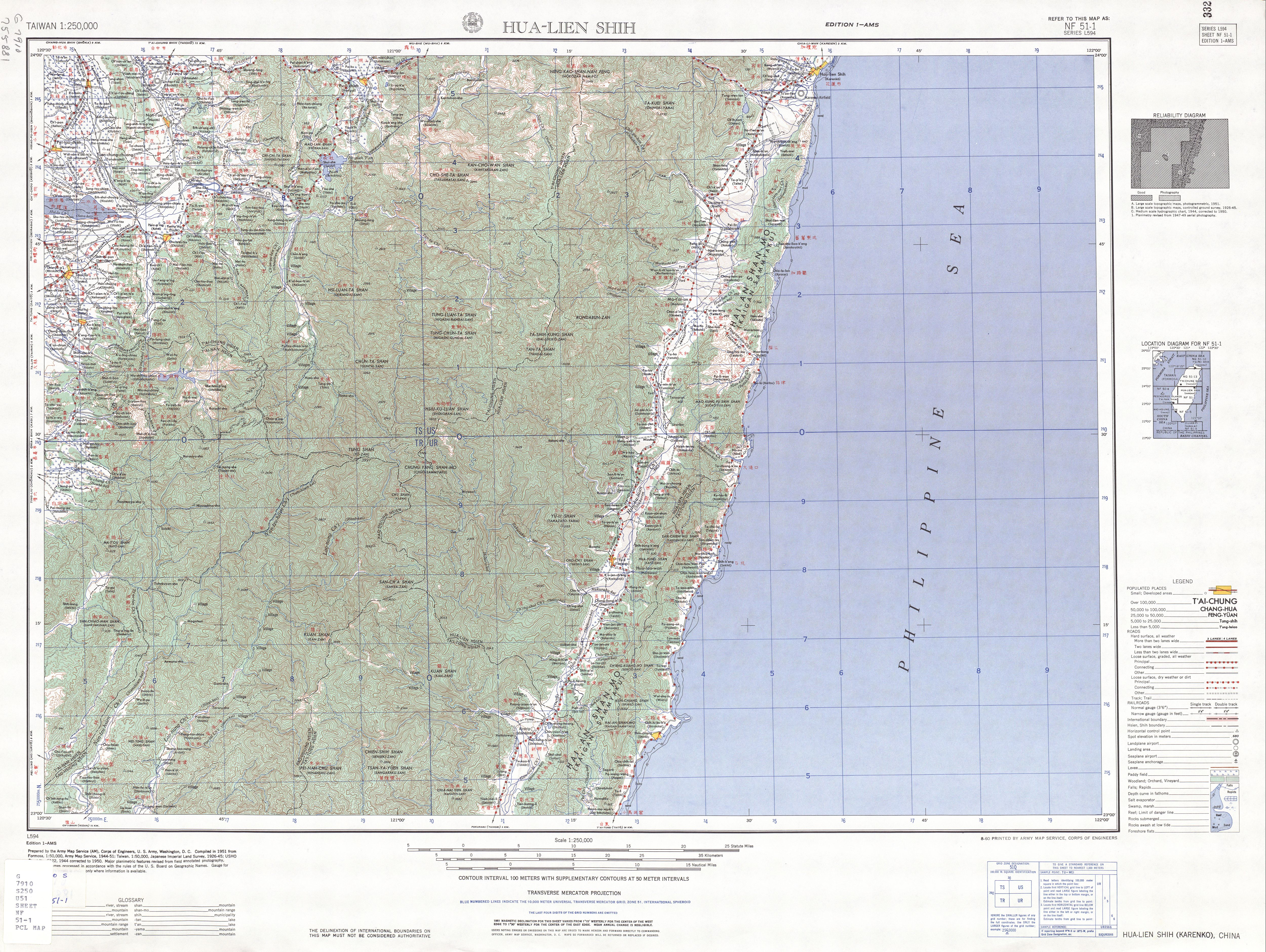
Map of the region including Yu Shan (labeled as TUNG SHAN (TŌ-ZAN) 東山) (1951)

The island of Taiwan is situated at the intersection of two tectonic plates: the Eurasian Plate and the Philippine Sea Plate. Even as "recently" as the late Paleozoic (some 250 million years ago), the land here was still but a sedimentary seabed layered with silt and sand. As the two plates began pressing against each other, the land buckled, bent, and created the landscape – composed of 165 mountains higher than 3,000 m (9,800 ft) above sea level on a relatively small island (38th largest in the world).

Yushan is also notable in containing the highest point on the Tropic of Cancer and the only point on that circle of latitude where there is any evidence of Quaternary glaciation. As recently as seventeen thousand years ago, permanent ice caps existed throughout Taiwan's highest mountains and extended owing to the wet climate down to 2,800 m (9,190 ft); whereas currently, the nearest glaciers to the Tropic of Cancer are in Mexico on the Iztaccíhuatl volcano.

The ocean waters off Taiwan's east coast are deep; in fact, submarine slopes plunge down to the Pacific Ocean at a grade of 1:10 and the ocean reaches a depth of more than 4,000 m (13,100 ft) about 50 km (30 mi) from the coast.

== Hiking ==
With panoramic views, overlapping mountains, and deep, plunging valleys, Yushan National Park is well known for its scenery, sunrises, sunsets, geological features, and views of the clouds from above. Sea of clouds often fill the valleys. Yushan itself is the focal point of the park.

Yushan is one of the favorites among Taiwanese mountain climbers. For international peak baggers, Yushan is ranked as the 4th World Island Highpoints and the 3rd Asian Island Highpoints. Some hikers combine trips to Puncak Jaya (4,884 m (16,024 ft)) in Indonesia and Mount Kinabalu (4,095 m (13,435 ft)) in Malaysia to create an "Asian Trilogy".

Yushan has five main peaks:

- Main Peak (玉山主峰), 3,952 m (12,966 ft), the most popular of the peaks
- Eastern Peak (玉山東峰), 3,869 m (12,694 ft) – 1.2 km (0.7 mi) from Main Peak
- Northern Peak (玉山北峰), 3,858 m (12,657 ft) – 2.2 km (1.4 mi) from Fengkou (風口, "Wind Tunnel")
- Southern Peak (玉山南峰), 3,844 m (12,612 ft) – 3.1 km (1.9 mi) from Paiyun Lodge (排雲山莊)
- Western Peak (玉山西峰), 3,467 m (11,375 ft) – 4 km (2.5 mi) from Paiyun Lodge

The east, west, north, and south peaks surround the main summit. The east peak rises to a height of 3,869 m (12,694 ft) and is considered one of Taiwan's Ten Major Summits (十峻). The south peak is a sharp pinnacle of black shale. The relatively accessible west side of Yushan is covered with thick forests. The north peak is part of a long, gently-rising ridge; this peak consists of two high points that resemble a camel's humps. The North Peak is also home to Taiwan's highest permanently occupied building, the Yushan weather station, where visitors are sometimes welcomed.

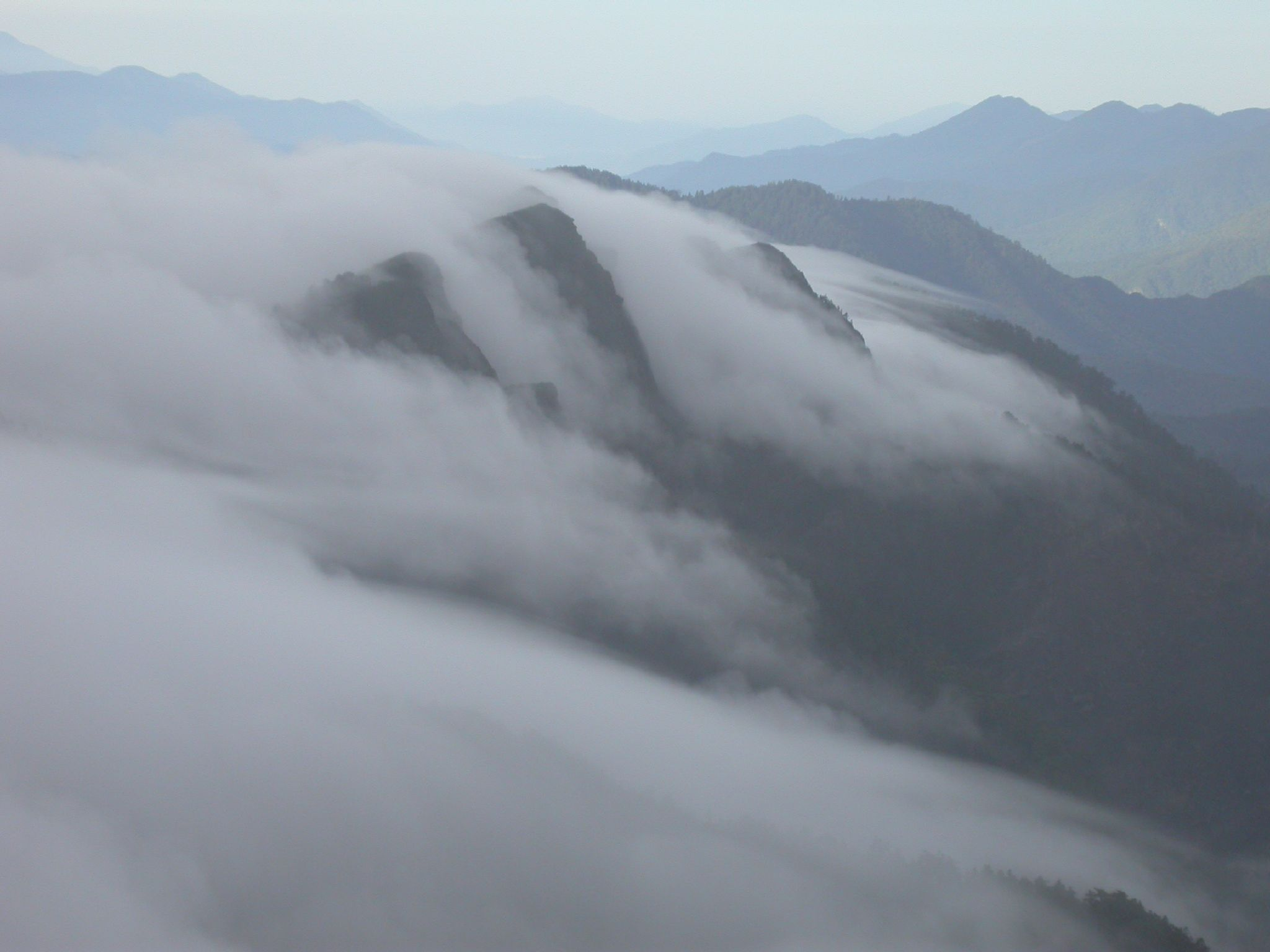
Sea of Clouds at Yushan

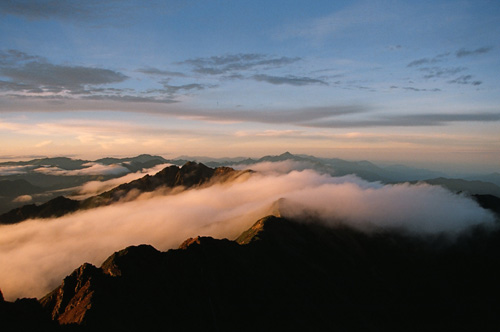
Sunrise at Yushan

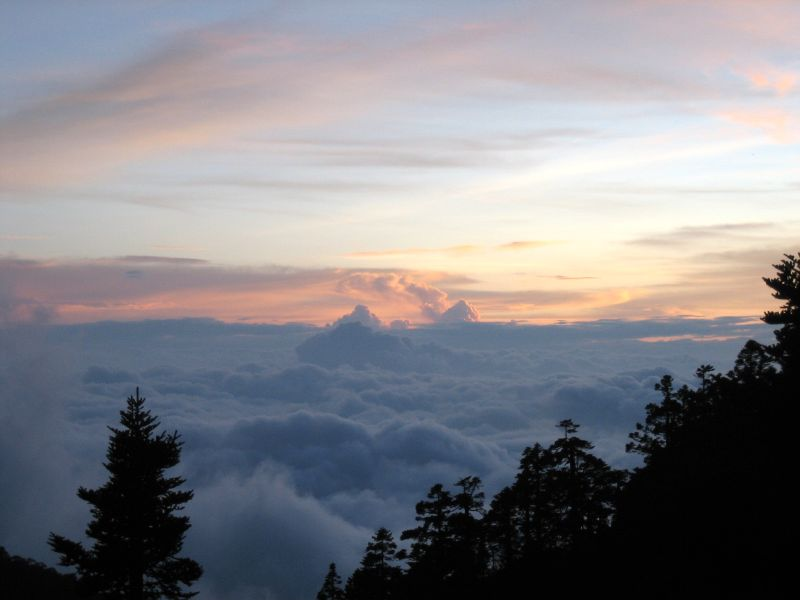
Sea of Clouds on Yushan Trail

== Flora and fauna ==
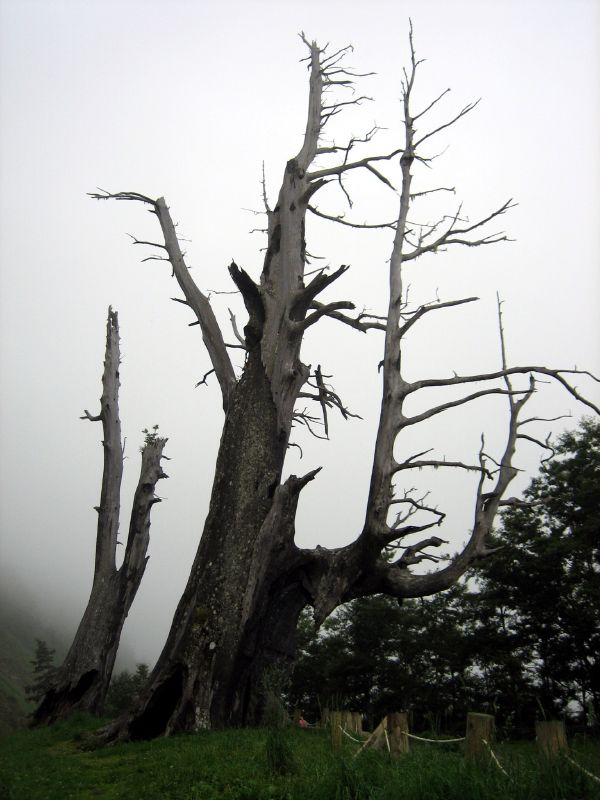
"Husband and Wife Trees", or "Fuci Trees" (夫妻樹). These are two surviving Chamaecyparis formosensis trees from a 1963 forest fire

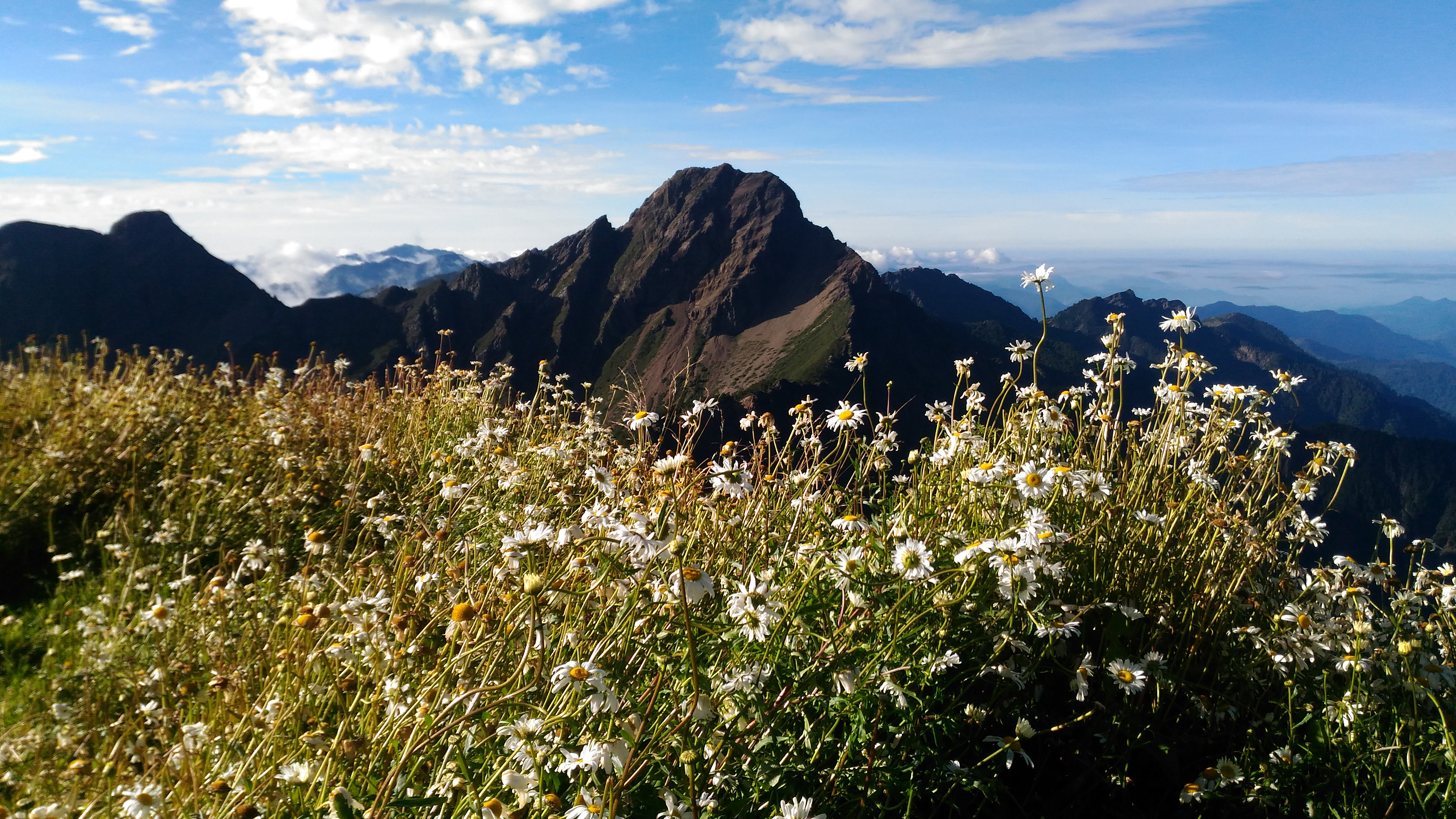
Yushan (玉山) Chamomile, Anthemis arvensis blossoms on the peak

Taiwan, with the tropic of Cancer across the center of the island, has a climate between tropical and subtropical. The average temperature is 23.5 °C (74.3 °F). Here low elevation areas support evergreen broadleaved forests. As elevation increases, evergreen broadleaved forests are gradually replaced by deciduous forests and coniferous forests. At mountain peaks with alpine conditions, only mosses, liverworts and occasionally grasses can be found on the ground.

All of the above vegetation variations can be seen in the Yushan area from low foothills to high summits with an elevation difference of 3.6 km (2.2 mi). Because of these wide climatic and vegetation variations, this environment nurtures the richest and most diversified wildlife in Taiwan. Preliminary investigations reveal that there are 130 species of birds, 28 species of mammals, 17 species of reptiles, 12 species of amphibians, and 186 species of butterflies in Yushan National Park. In fact, Yushan is nicknamed "the ark" by academics who see it as a repository of Taiwan's rare species. It is almost an encyclopedia of Taiwan's ecological systems, a geological museum and an important habitat of one-third of Taiwan's endemic species, such as:

- Formosan serow (台灣長鬃山羊)
- Reeves's muntjac (台灣山羌)
- Formosan black bear (台灣黑熊)
- Formosan blue magpie (台灣藍鵲)
- Formosan rock macaque (台灣獼猴)
- Hemimyzon taitungensis (台東間爬岩鰍) and Varicorhinus tamusuiensis (Oshima) – Two unique fish species living in the Lekuleku River area.

== History ==
Under the Qing Dynasty, W. Morrison, captain of the American steam freighter Alexander, sighted the mountain while departing from Anping Harbor (present-day Anping, Tainan) in 1857. His log was the first western mention of the mountain, which took his name in European accounts. European mountaineers couldn't access the mountain at the time due to hostile relations of local aborigines to both Qing authorities and Europeans.

Under the Japanese, the anthropologists Torii Ryūzō and Ushinosuke Mori became the first people recorded to summit the mountain in 1900. They gave it the name "Mount Niitaka", which was used as the name of the Niitaka Arisan National Park (新高阿里山国立公園) in 1937. The Imperial Japanese Navy also used the mountain's name in its "Go" signal—NIITAKAYAMANOBORE 1208 (ニイタカヤマノボレ一二○八 [Kanji: 新高山登レ一二○八]), meaning "Climb Mount Niitaka 1208"—to begin the surprise attack against the USN Pacific Fleet and its base at Pearl Harbor, Hawaii, on 7 December 1941 (8 December [1208] in Japanese calendar). (Note: The "Go" signal was first issued by Admiral Isoroku Yamamoto. The signal was extended and used throughout the exercises and the course of the operation. On the other hand, the "No Go" signal, if needed, would be TSUKUBAYAMAHARE (ツクバヤマハレ [Kanji: 筑波山晴れ]), meaning "Mount Tsukuba is sunny".) During the time that Taiwan was an integral part of the Japanese Empire, Mt. Niitaka's height of 3,952 m meant that, for about 50 years, it was the highest mountain in Japan, 176 m higher than Mt. Fuji.

The Yushan weather station on the north peak was finished in 1943.

Under the Republic of China, a large bronze statue of Yu Youren was placed on the Yushan summit in 1966. The statue was cut down and thrown into a ravine by activists for Taiwan independence in 1996.

In recent years, Yushan has played an important role in a new focus on Taiwan's identity. Because of its iconic status, Yushan has been chosen to be the background of the newly issued NT$1,000 notes on 20 July 2005. Similarly, an asteroid discovered by National Central University's Lulin Observatory on 28 December 2007 was named "Yushan" in honor of the mountain.

== Climate ==
Yushan has an alpine climate (Köppen ET/ETf). The tip of Yushan is usually covered with frost from November to March. Elevations above 2,000 metres (6,600 ft) may sometimes see snow during the winter months, and there are four consecutive months of snow accumulation at places with elevations higher than 3,000 metres (9,800 ft). The first snow may appear in October and completely melts by May. Snow falls 24.3 days per year on average on Yushan, and the number is gradually decreasing. Yushan receives around 3,100 mm (120 in) of precipitation annually. It rains an average of 140 days per year, with the greatest frequency between May and August. From May until the first part of June is plum rain season or monsoon season. Taiwan's typhoon season roughly falls between July and September. The peak month is in August, which sees 520 mm (20 in) of precipitation on average, compared to 70 mm (2.8 in) in December, the driest month.

Climate data for Yushan (1991–2020 normals, extremes 1943–present）
Month	Jan	Feb	Mar	Apr	May	Jun	Jul	Aug	Sep	Oct	Nov	Dec	Year
Record high °C (°F)	18.9 (66.0)	23.4 (74.1)	20.9 (69.6)	23.2 (73.8)	24.8 (76.6)	26.2 (79.2)	25.9 (78.6)	22.6 (72.7)	23.6 (74.5)	24.2 (75.6)	20.2 (68.4)	16.8 (62.2)	26.2 (79.2)
Mean daily maximum °C (°F)	4.6 (40.3)	4.5 (40.1)	6.4 (43.5)	8.7 (47.7)	11.2 (52.2)	12.9 (55.2)	14.4 (57.9)	14.0 (57.2)	14.0 (57.2)	13.9 (57.0)	10.6 (51.1)	6.7 (44.1)	10.2 (50.4)
Daily mean °C (°F)	−0.5 (31.1)	−0.2 (31.6)	1.4 (34.5)	3.6 (38.5)	6.0 (42.8)	7.4 (45.3)	8.0 (46.4)	7.8 (46.0)	7.4 (45.3)	6.6 (43.9)	4.1 (39.4)	1.2 (34.2)	4.4 (39.9)
Mean daily minimum °C (°F)	−4.0 (24.8)	−3.4 (25.9)	−1.7 (28.9)	0.6 (33.1)	3.0 (37.4)	4.5 (40.1)	4.6 (40.3)	4.6 (40.3)	4.1 (39.4)	2.8 (37.0)	0.7 (33.3)	−2.1 (28.2)	1.1 (34.0)
Record low °C (°F)	−18.4 (−1.1)	−14.8 (5.4)	−15.2 (4.6)	−10.1 (13.8)	−3.9 (25.0)	−1.9 (28.6)	−3.2 (26.2)	−0.4 (31.3)	−2.4 (27.7)	−6.1 (21.0)	−10.6 (12.9)	−15.0 (5.0)	−18.4 (−1.1)
Average precipitation mm (inches)	83.7 (3.30)	67.2 (2.65)	94.8 (3.73)	201.2 (7.92)	423.6 (16.68)	459.6 (18.09)	434.2 (17.09)	516.0 (20.31)	297.2 (11.70)	145.1 (5.71)	98.3 (3.87)	81.6 (3.21)	2,902.5 (114.27)
Average precipitation days (≥ 0.1 mm)	6.8	6.9	7.8	13.1	18.7	18.0	18.1	18.4	14.4	10.1	8.2	6.5	147.0
Average relative humidity (%)	62.3	70.7	76.2	80.0	81.5	80.8	77.7	81.0	77.4	66.4	65.9	63.1	73.6
Mean monthly sunshine hours	207.0	158.7	151.0	139.4	133.8	135.9	171.3	150.8	158.5	213.6	199.7	197.1	2,016.8
Percentage possible sunshine	62	51	41	37	33	34	42	38	44	60	61	60	46
Source: Central Weather Bureau

== Gallery ==
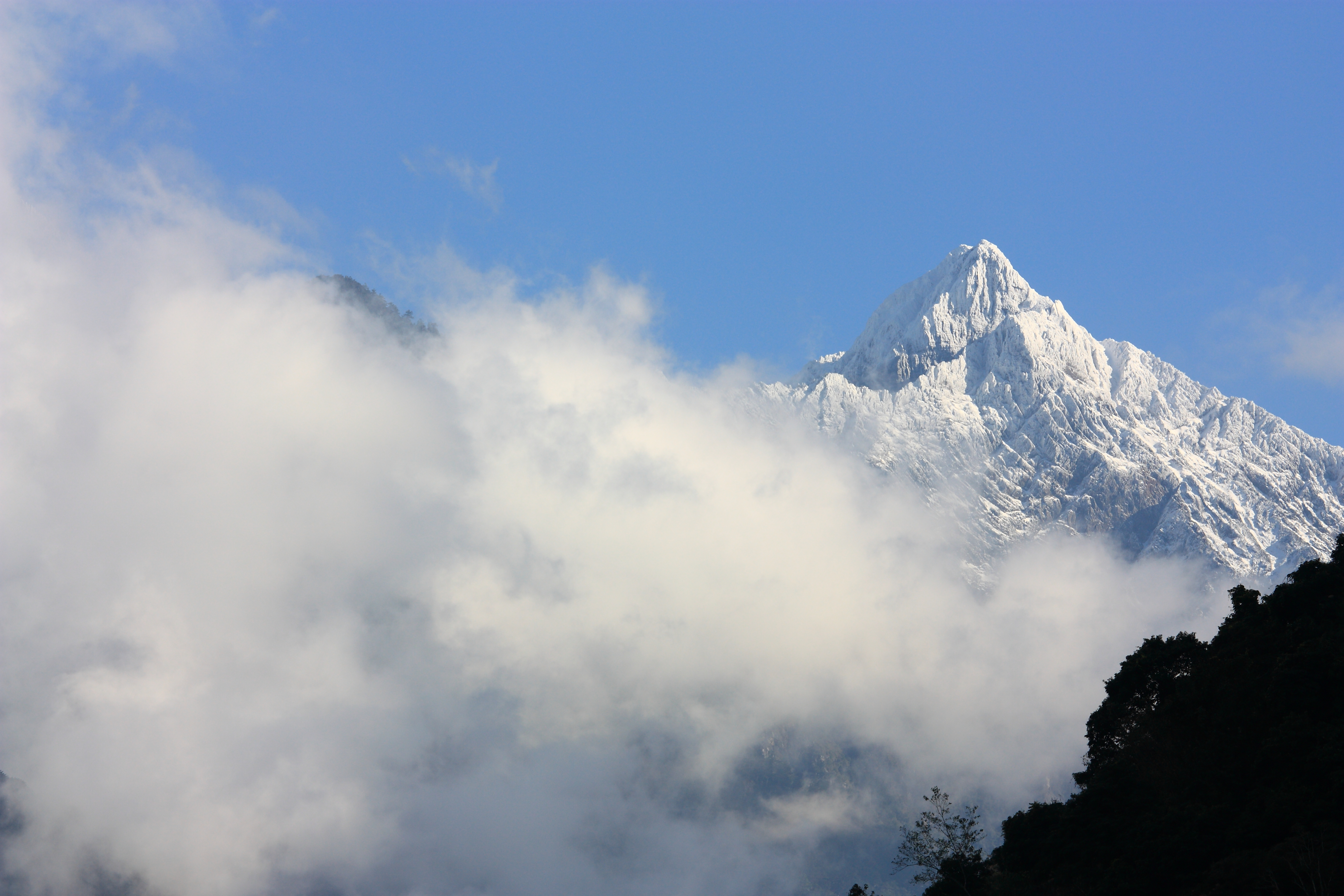
Yushan (玉山) during winter season

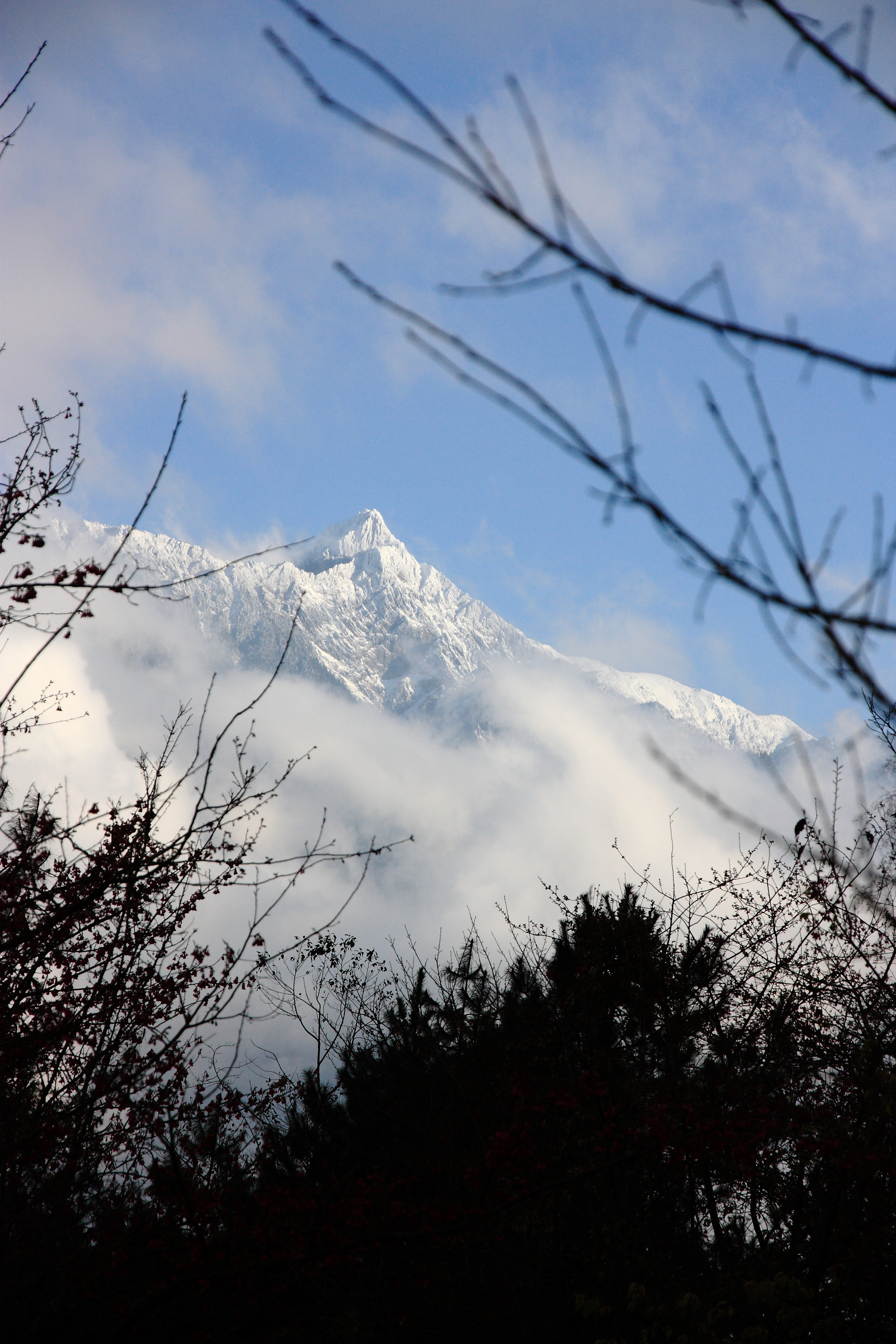
Yushan (玉山) during winter season

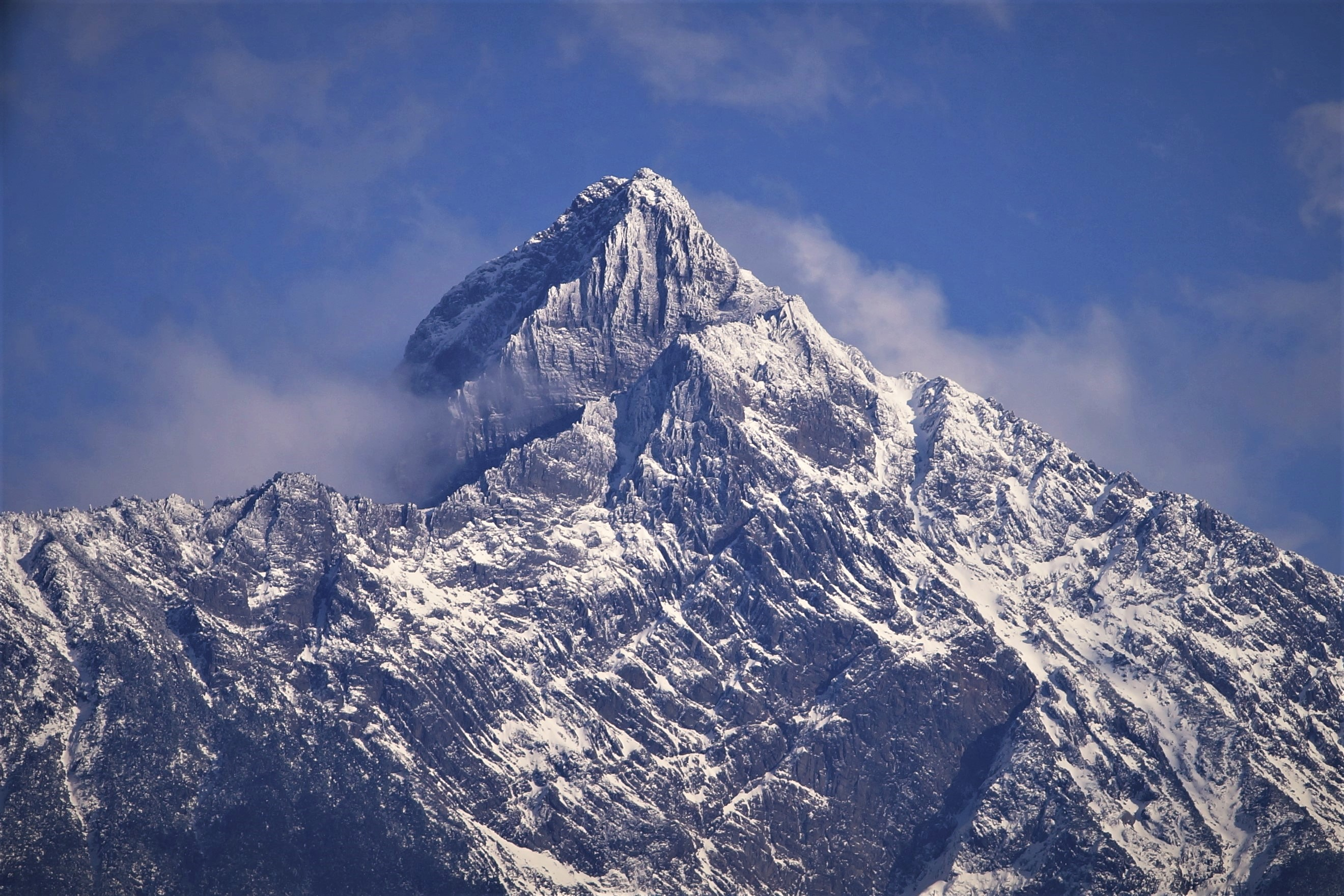
Yushan (玉山) during winter season

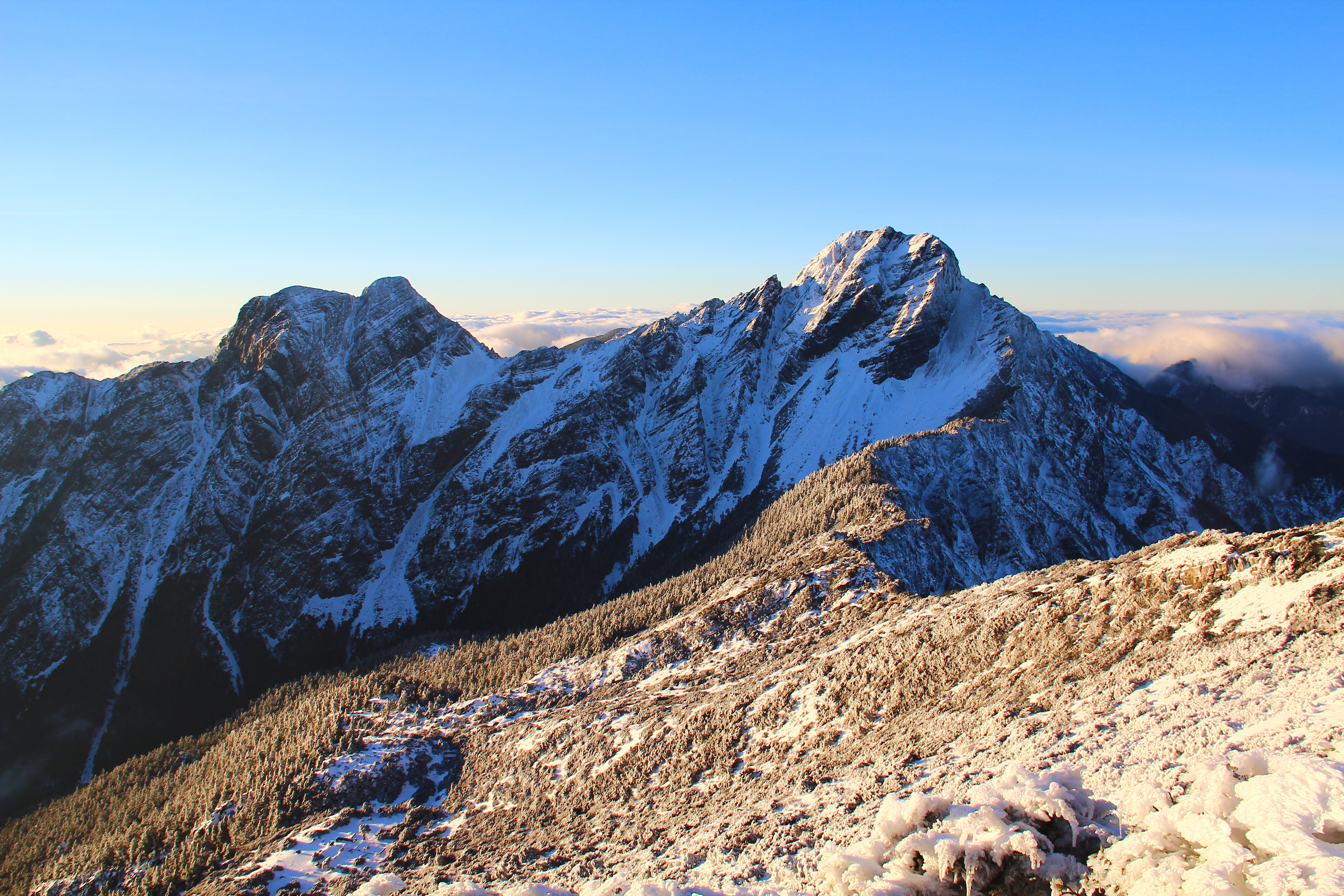
Yushan (玉山) during winter season

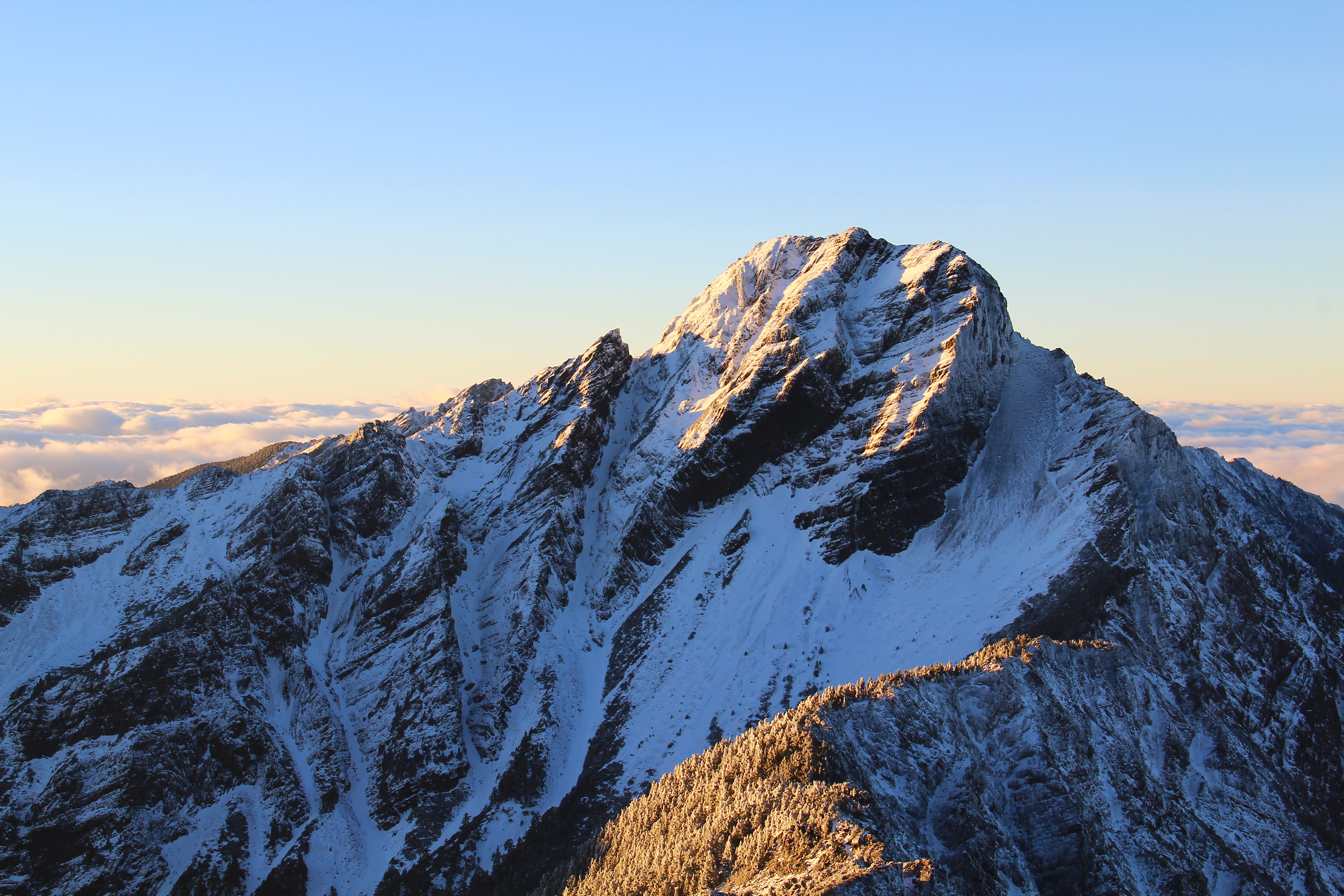
Yushan (玉山) during winter season

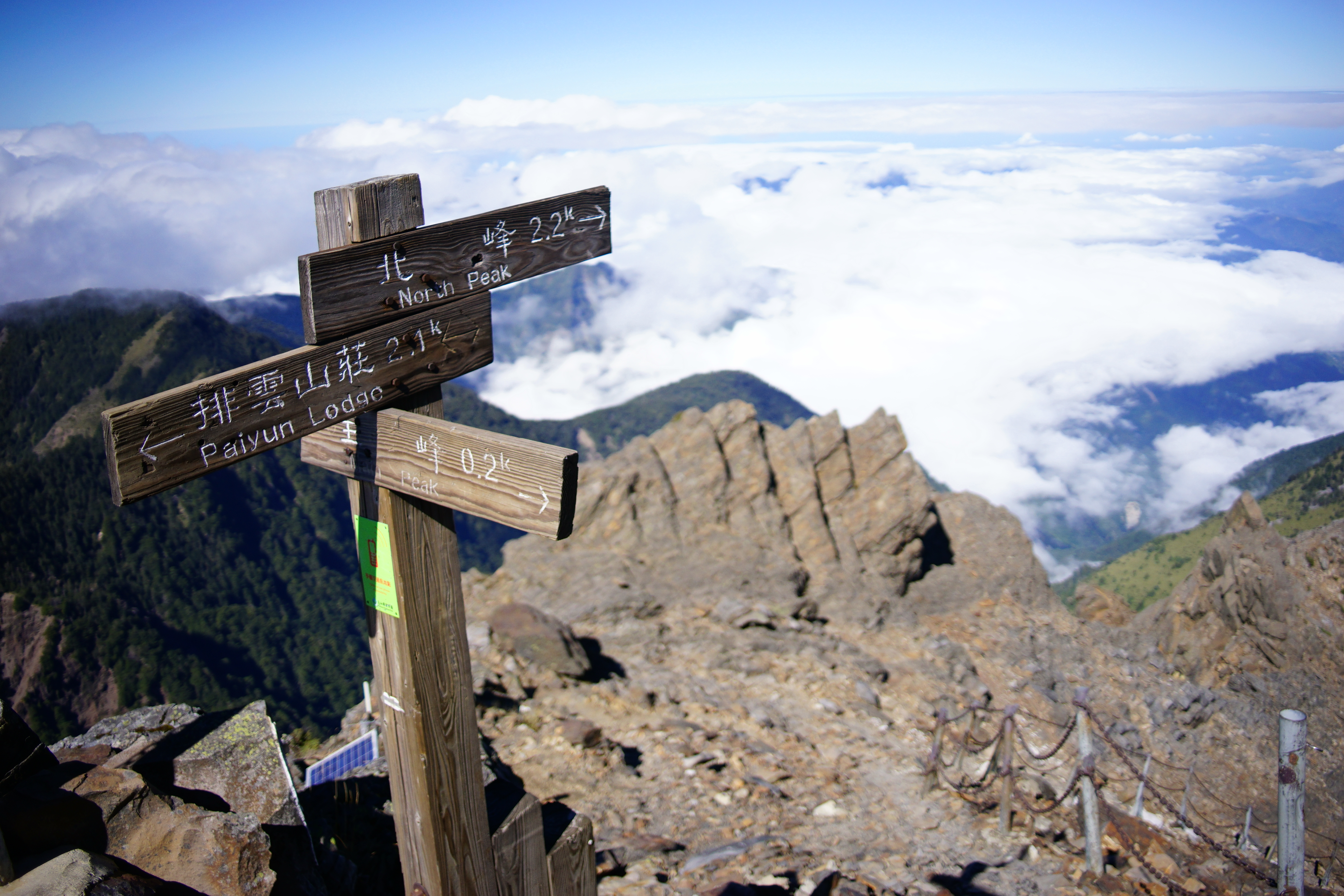
Yushan Trail signage

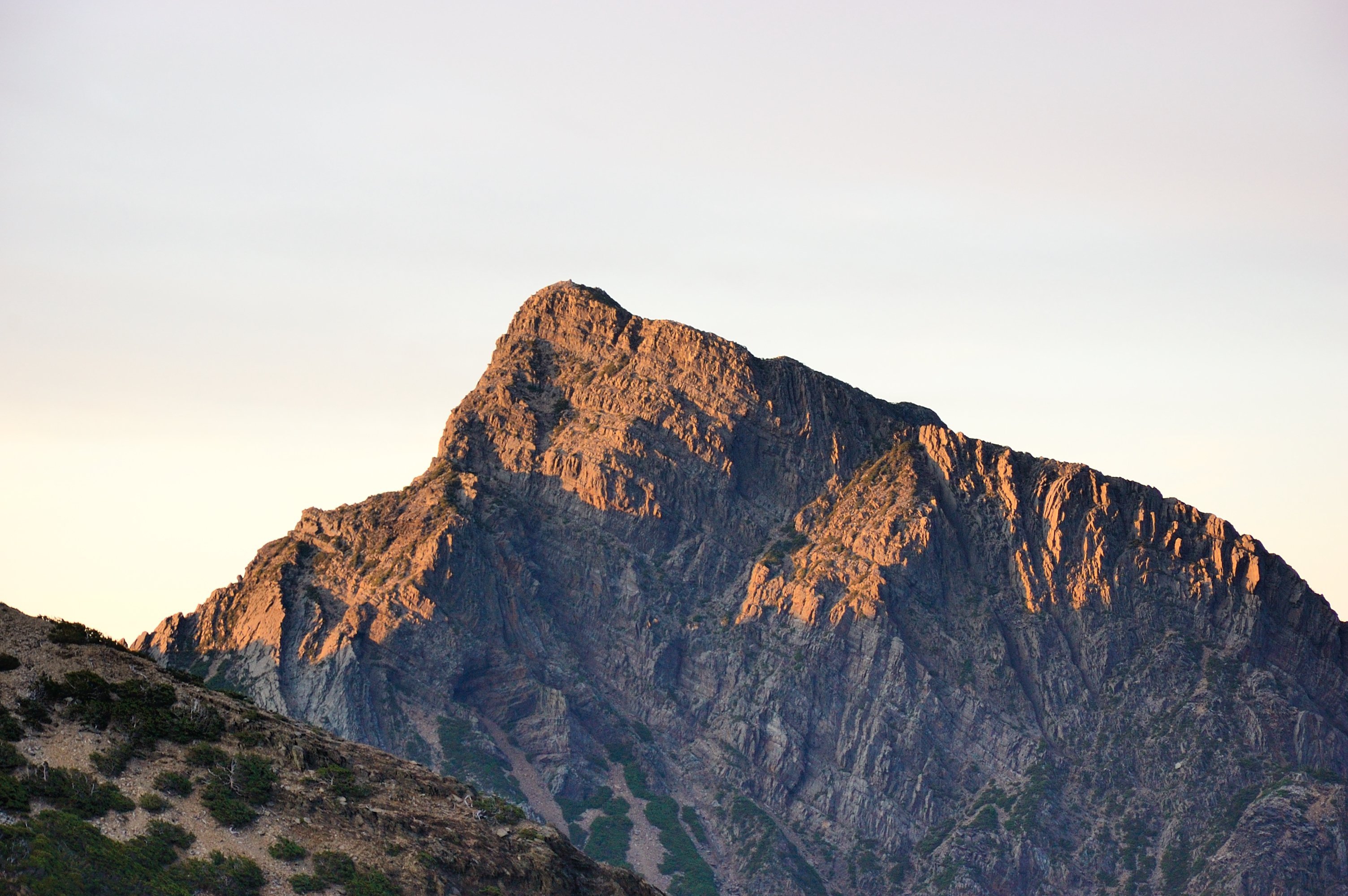
Yushan (玉山)

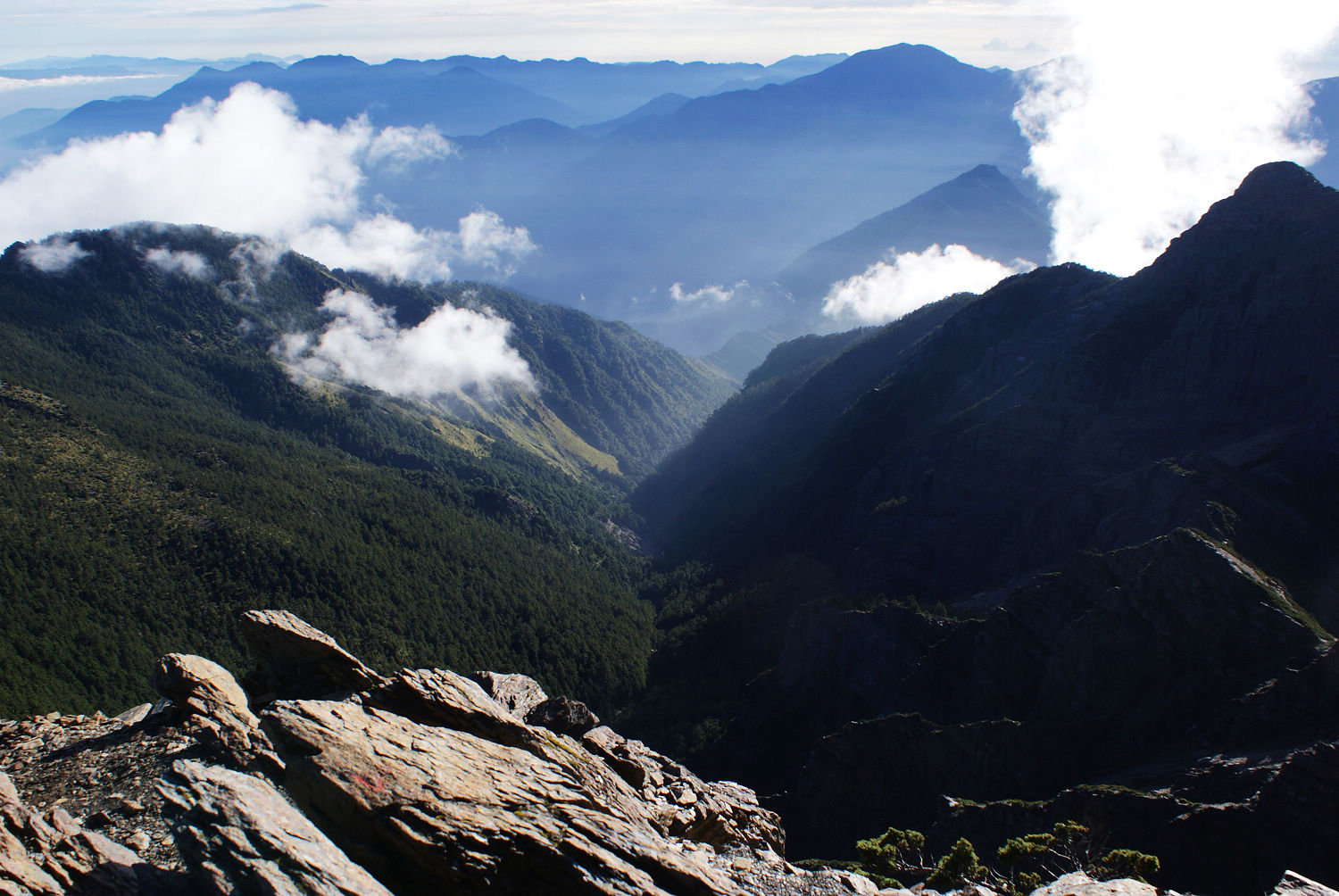
Laonung River at the northeastern side of Yushan

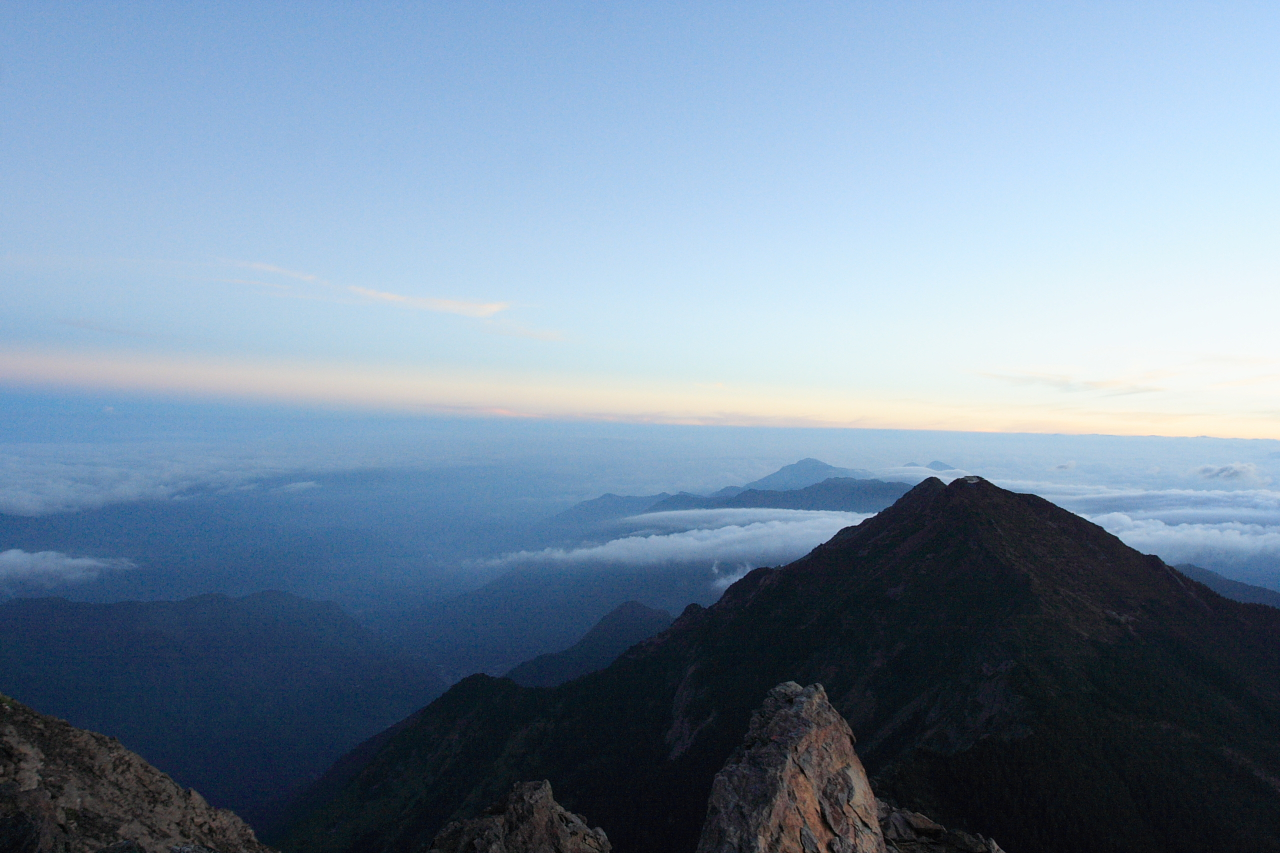
Sea of clouds on Yushan Trail

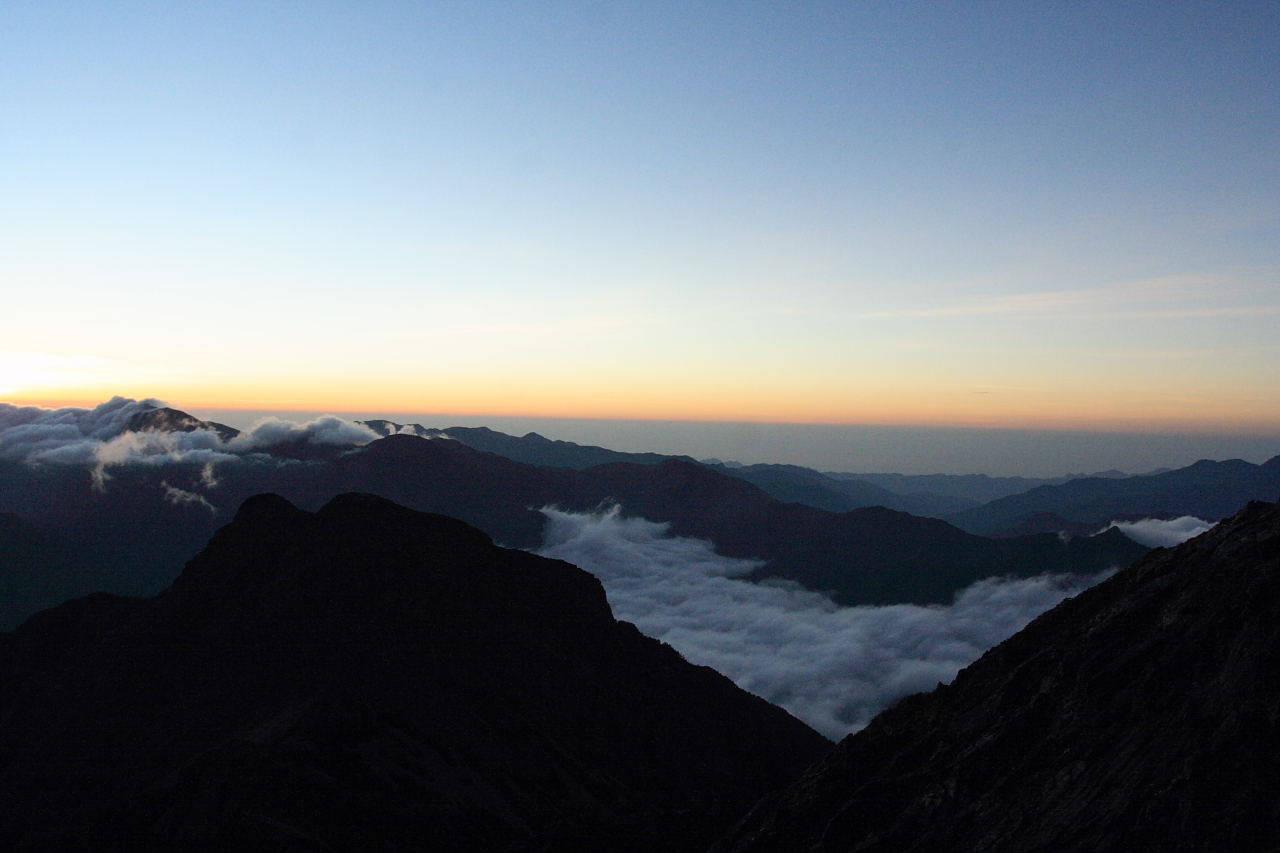
Sea of clouds on Yushan Trail

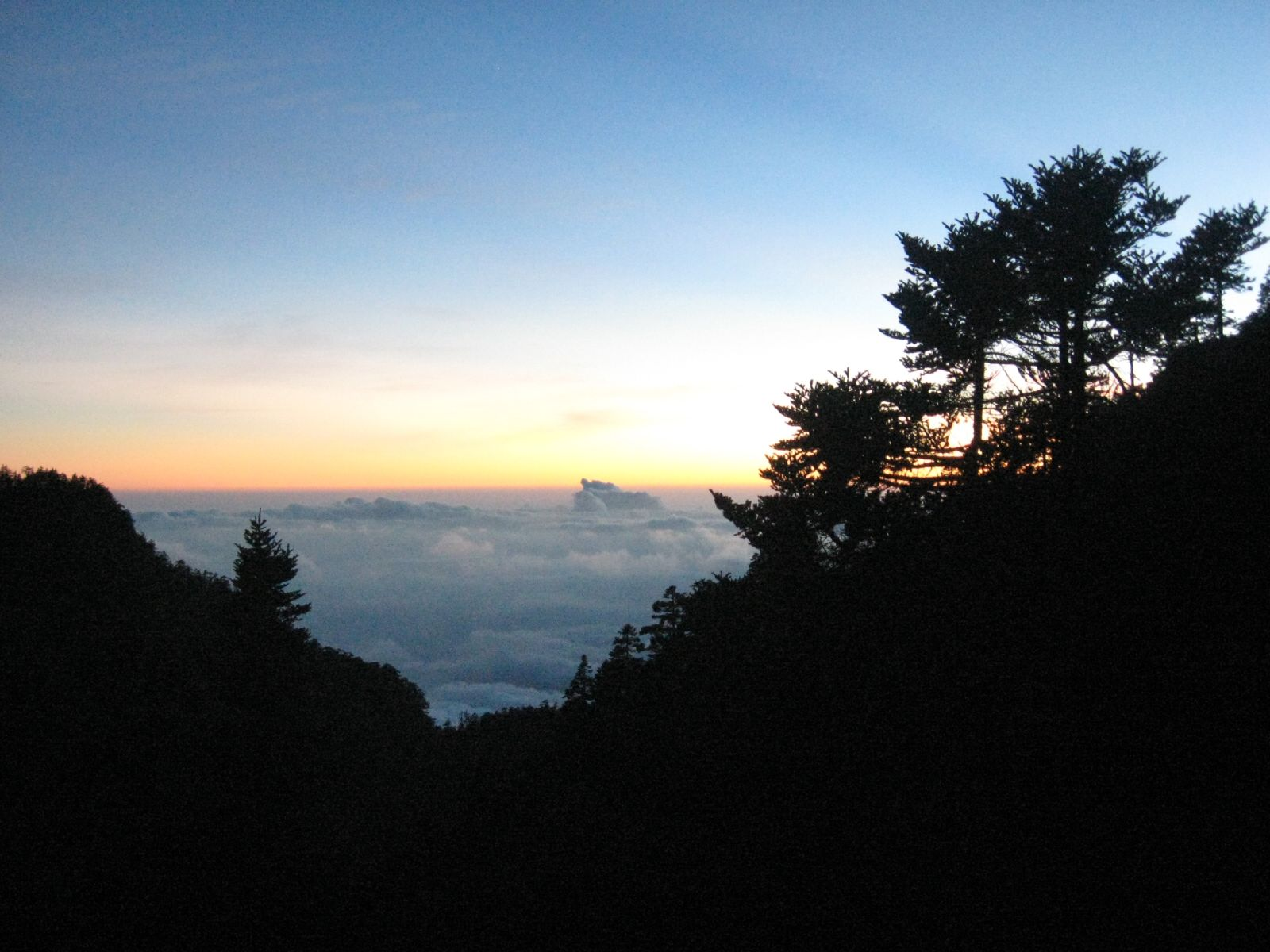
Sea of clouds on Yushan Trail

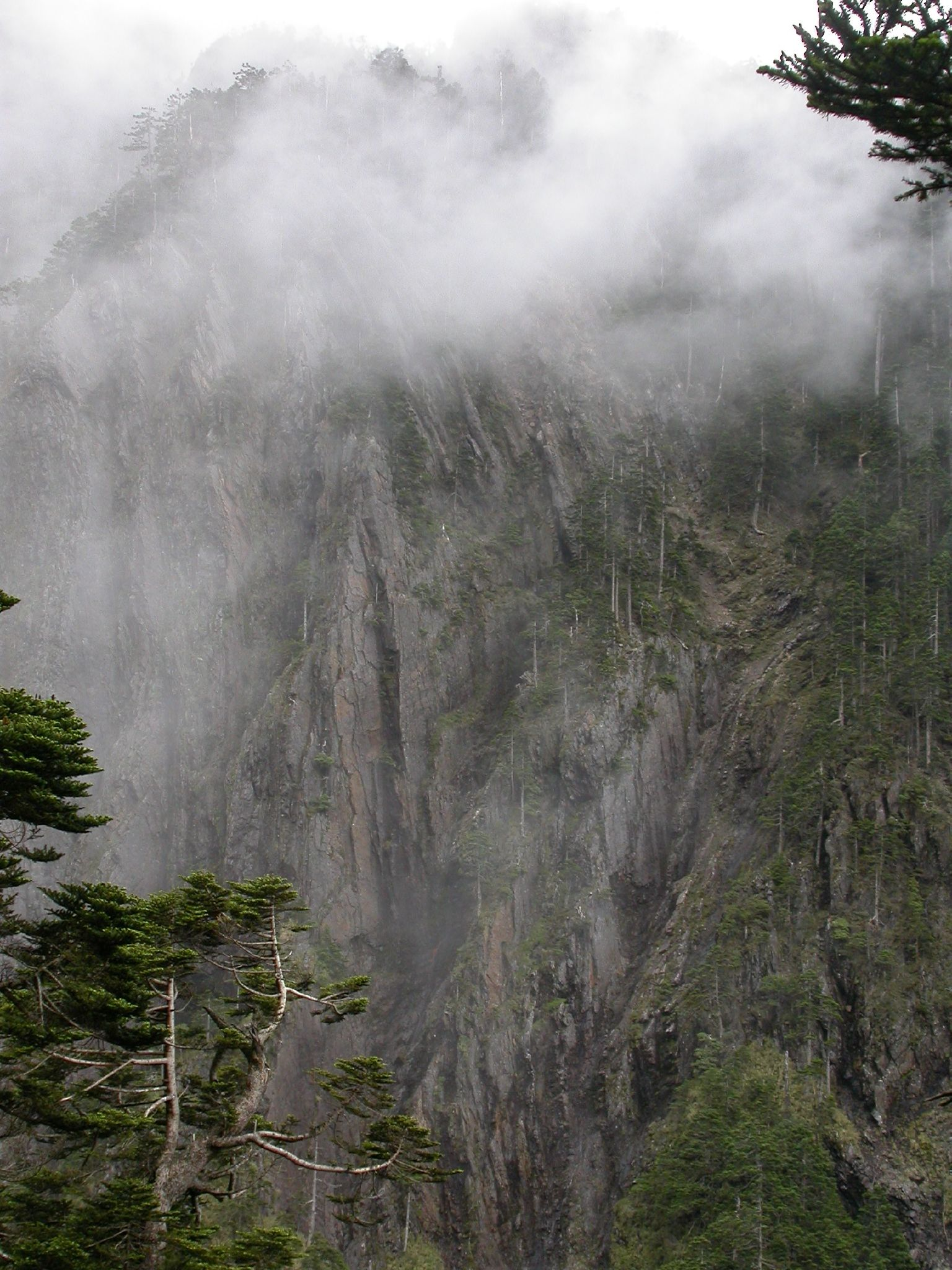
Sea of clouds near Tatajia Anbu on Yushan Trail

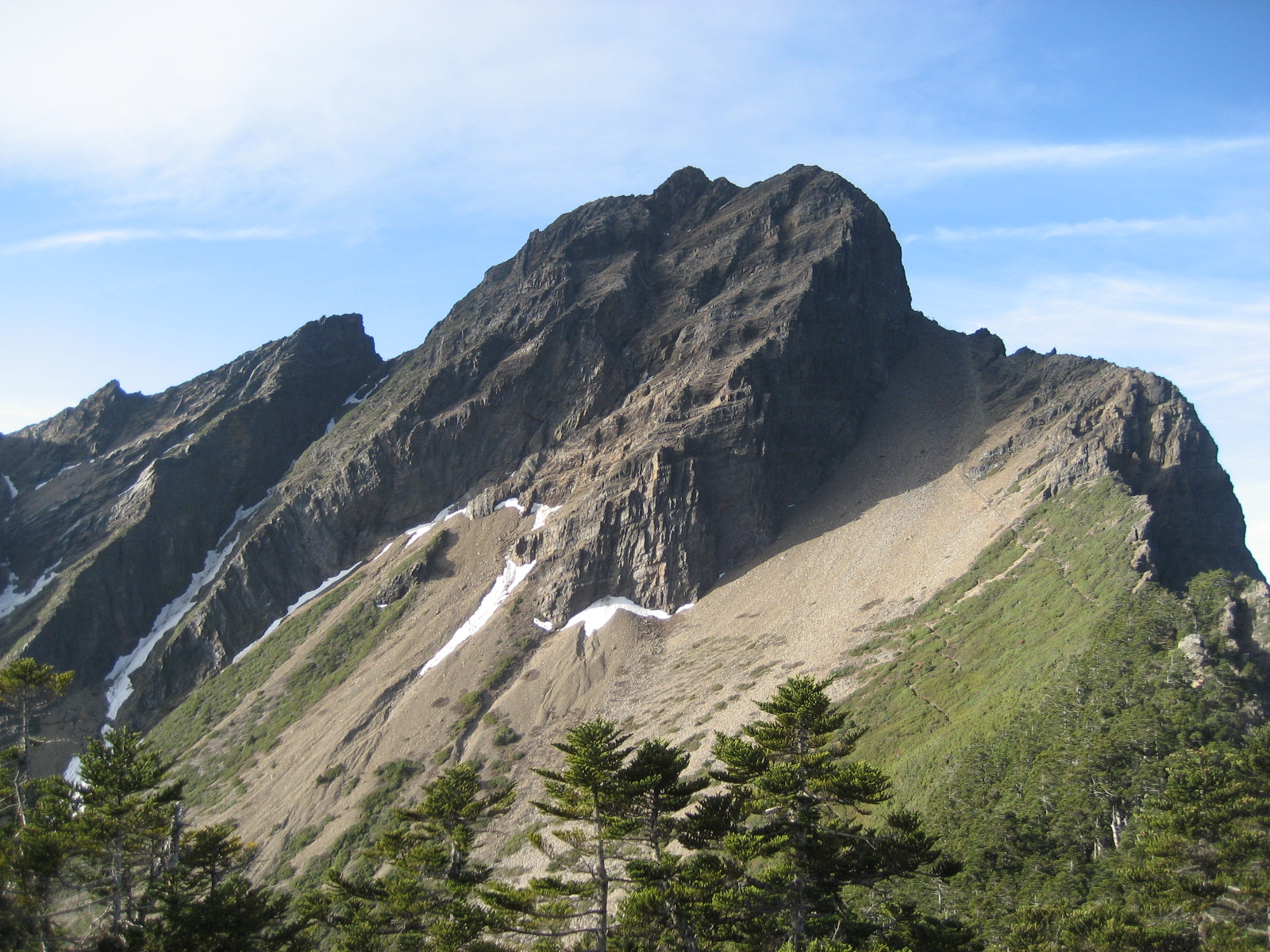
Mountain in the morning

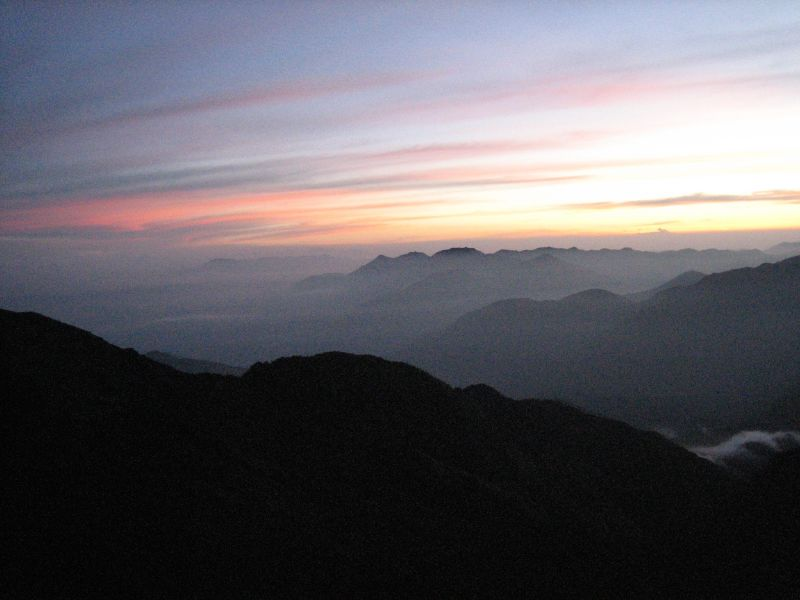
Sunrise at Yushan

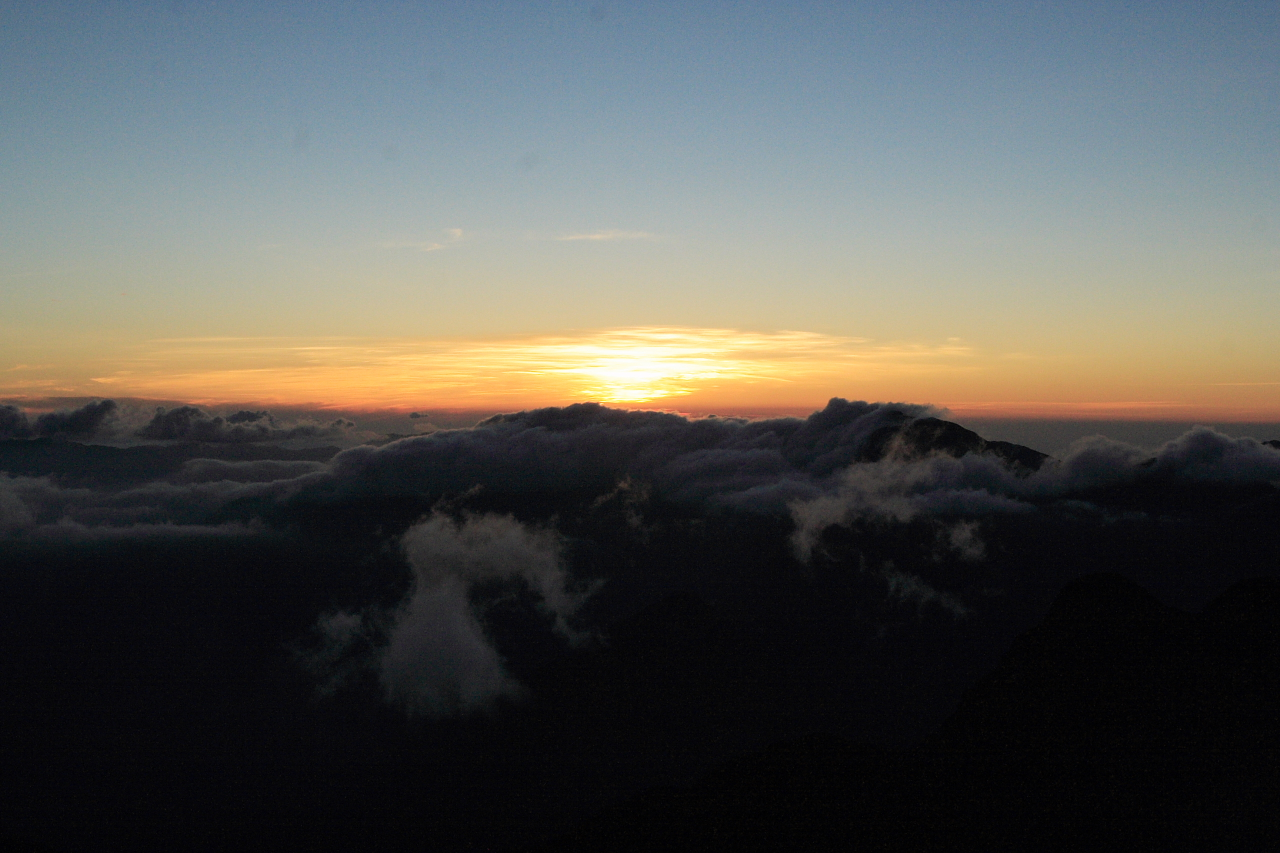
Sunrise at Yushan

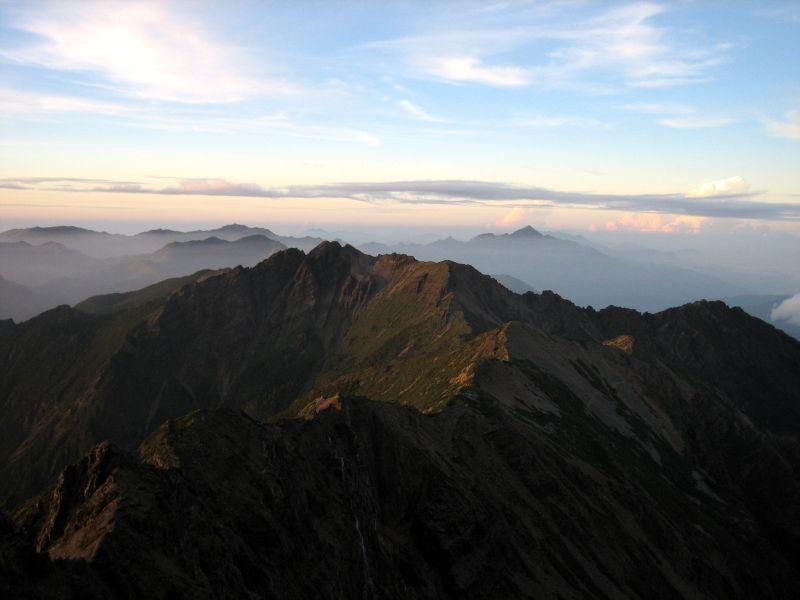
Sunrise at Yushan

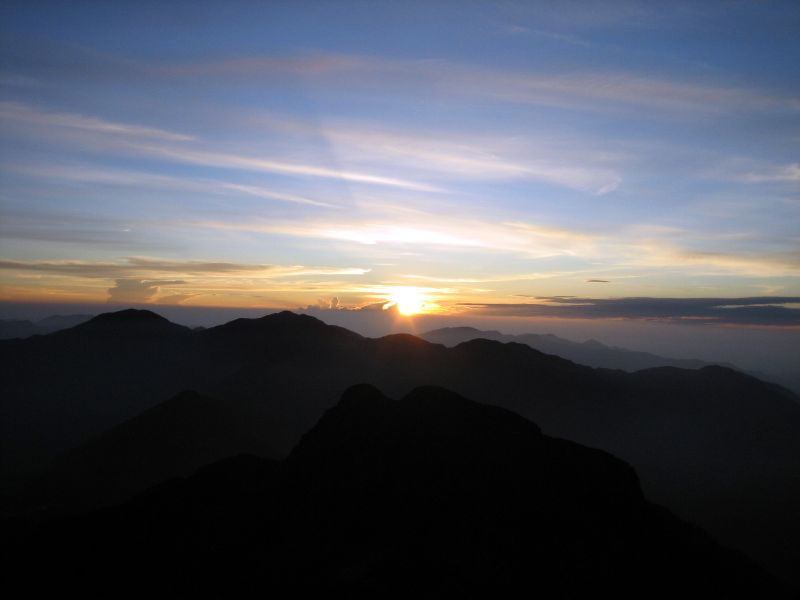
Sunrise at Yushan

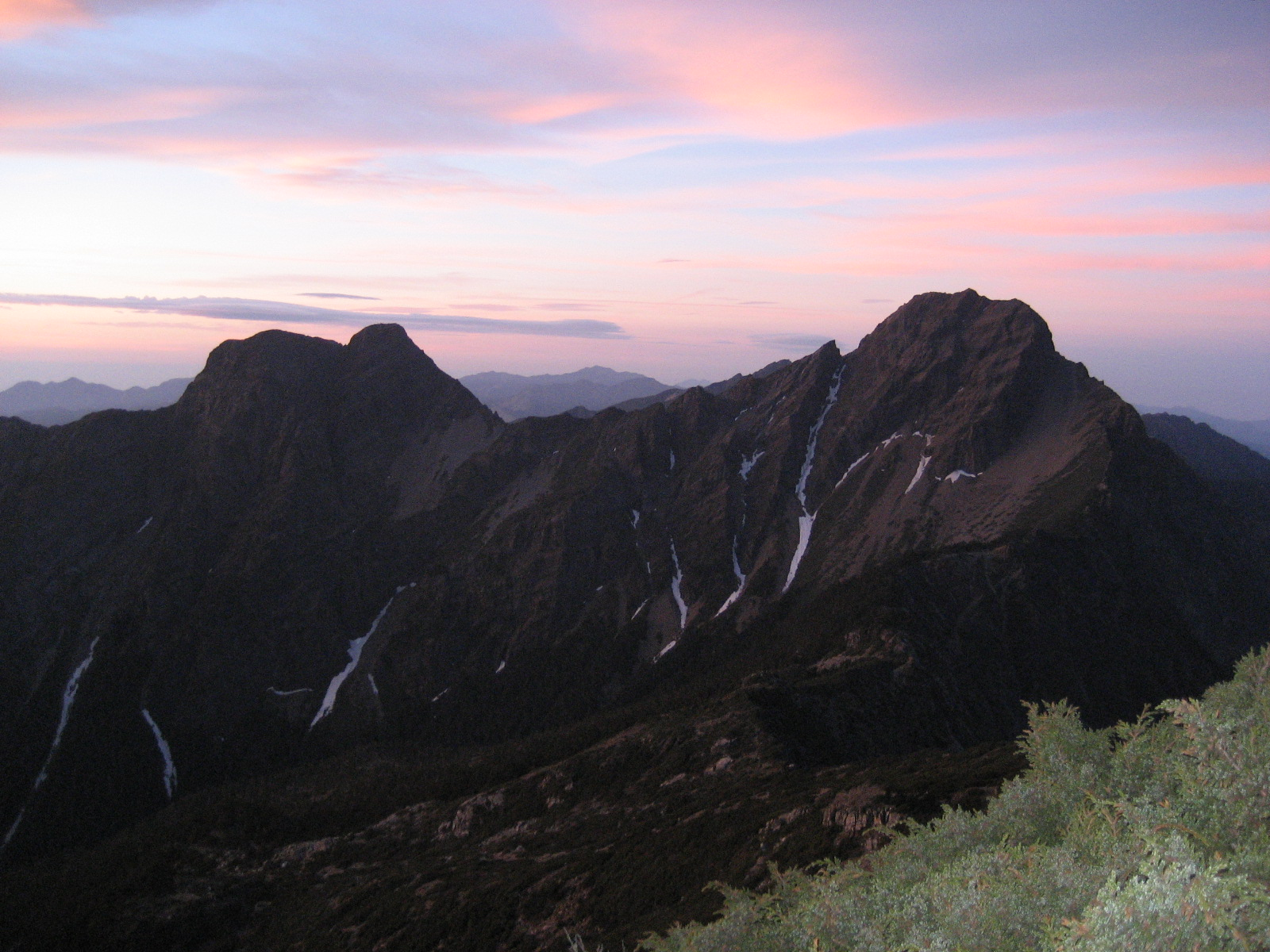
Mountain with sunset

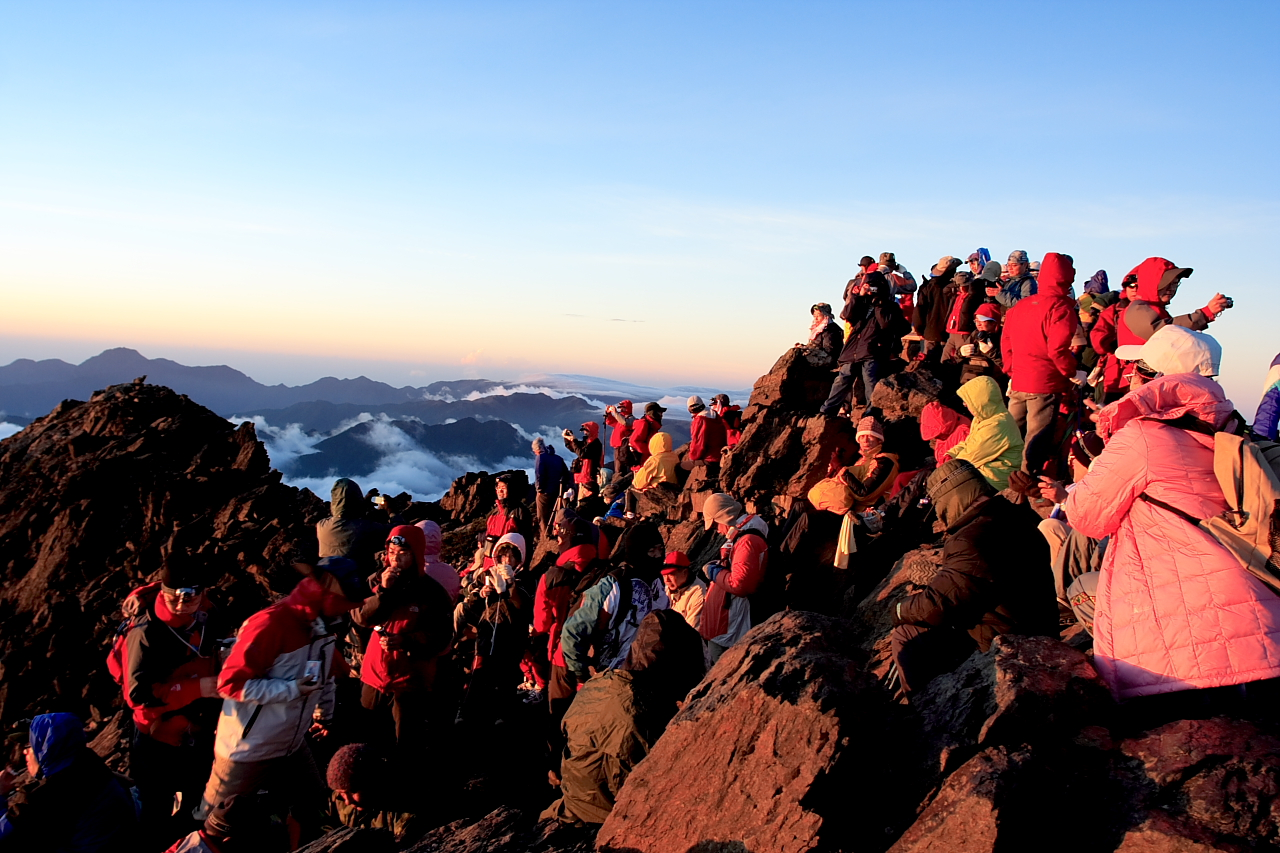
Hikers at the summit

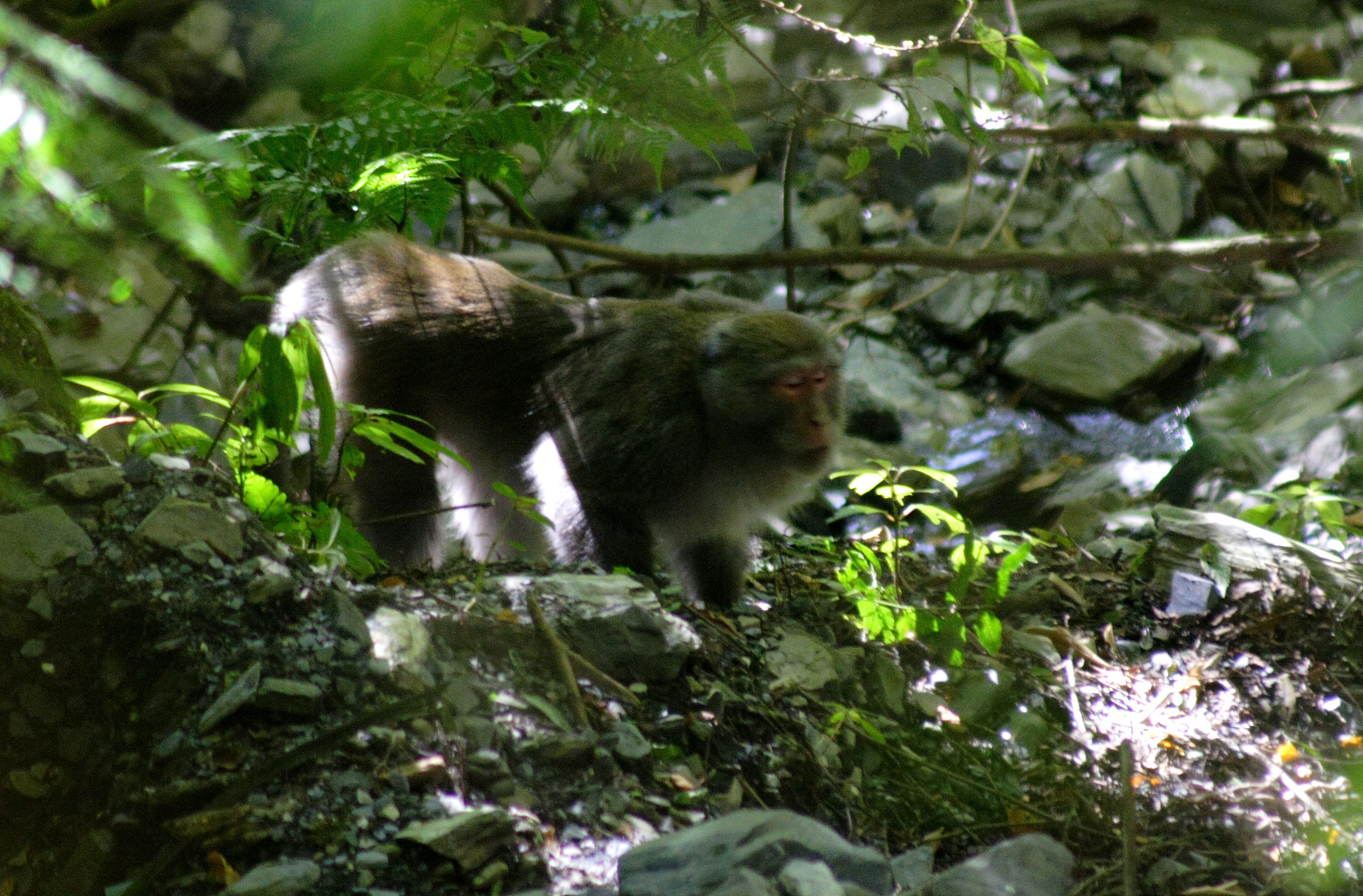
Formosan rock macaque found on Yushan Trail

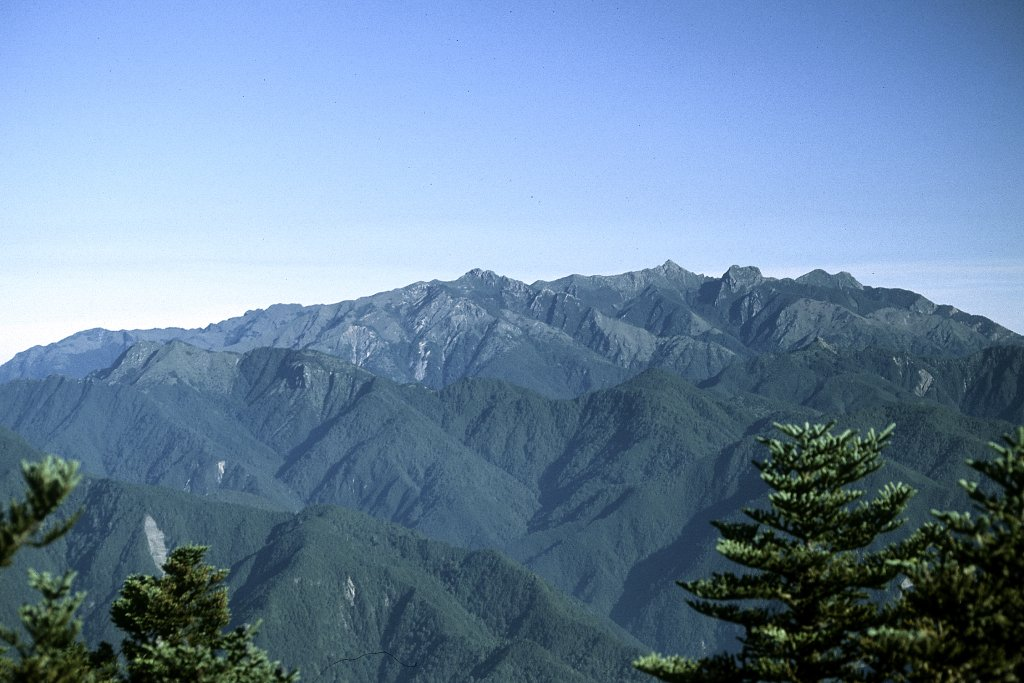
Yushan Range, eastern side view

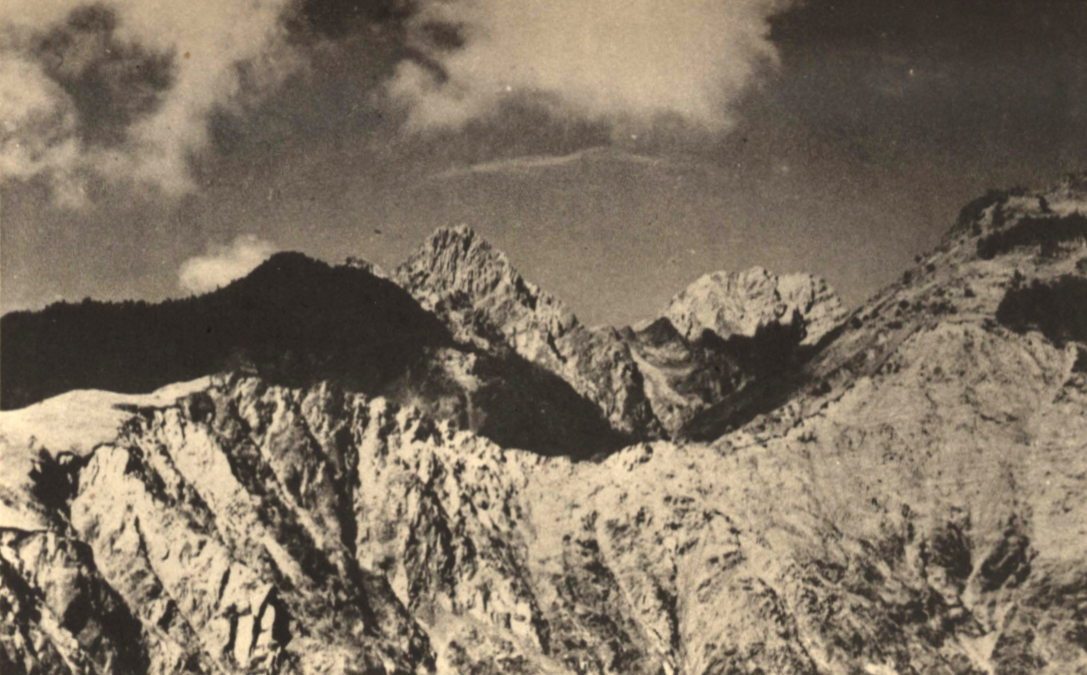
Yushan on November 1, 1935

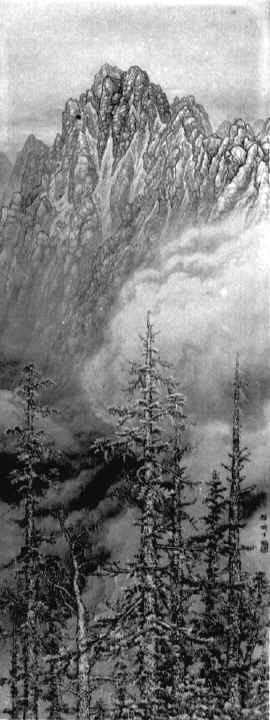
Painting of Yushan by Nasu Masaki (那須雅城)

== See also ==
- 100 Peaks of Taiwan
- List of mountains in Taiwan
- List of islands by highest point
- List of ultras of Tibet, East Asia and neighbouring areas
- Yushan National Park
- Yushan Range
- Yushan-class landing platform dock
- Green Jade
