= Lanyu Weather Station =

Weather station in Lanyu, Taitung County, Taiwan

- 蘭嶼氣象站
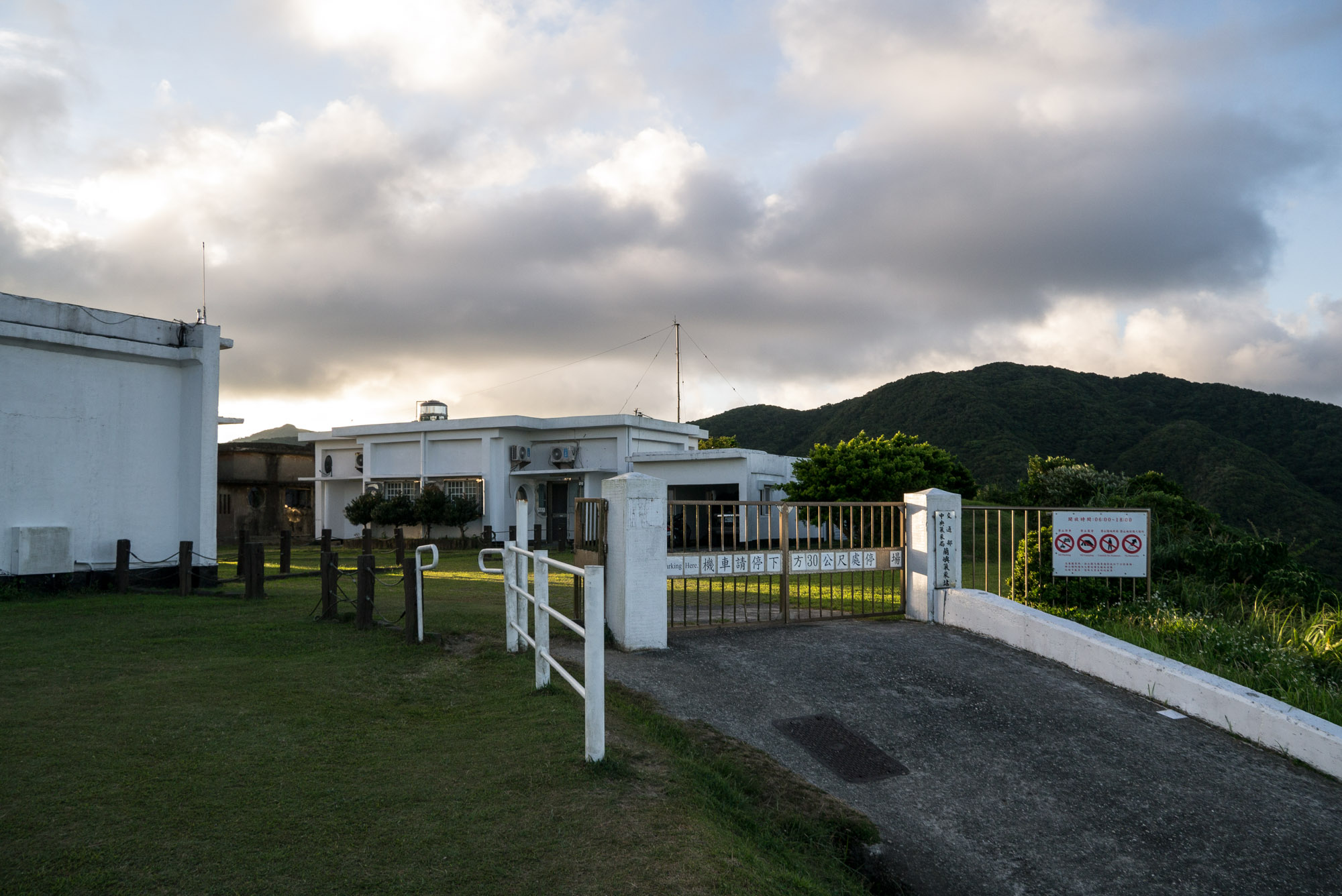
- Interactive map of the Lanyu Weather Station area

General information
- Type: weather station
- Location: Lanyu, Taitung County, Taiwan
- Coordinates: 22°02′13.9″N 121°33′30.1″E
- Completed: 1940

The Lanyu Weather Station (traditional Chinese: 蘭嶼氣象站; simplified Chinese: 兰屿气象站; pinyin: Lányǔ Qìxiàng Zhàn) is a weather station in Orchid Island, Taitung County, Taiwan.

== History ==
The weather station was constructed in 1940 during the Japanese rule of Taiwan and established under the name Red Head Island Weather Station (Chinese: 紅頭嶼測候所). The station was heavily damaged during the World War II by the United States Armed Forces. After the war ended, the station was restored to its original condition.

== See also ==
- Geography of Taiwan
- Yushan weather station
