= Yushan weather station =

Weather station in Taiwan

Coordinates: 23.4874°N 120.9594°E

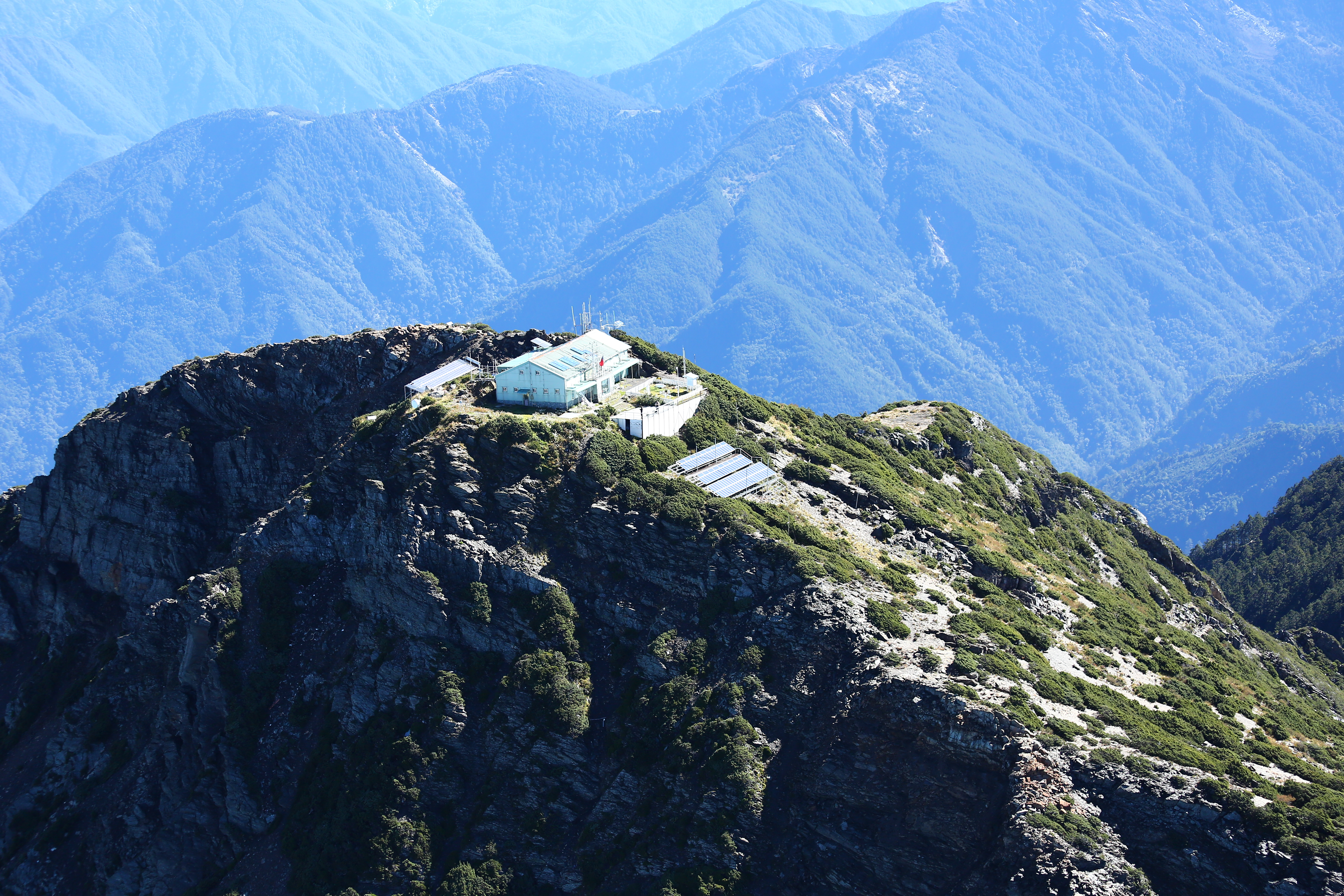
Yushan weather station close up

The Yushan weather station is a weather station operated by the Central Weather Administration.

== Overview ==
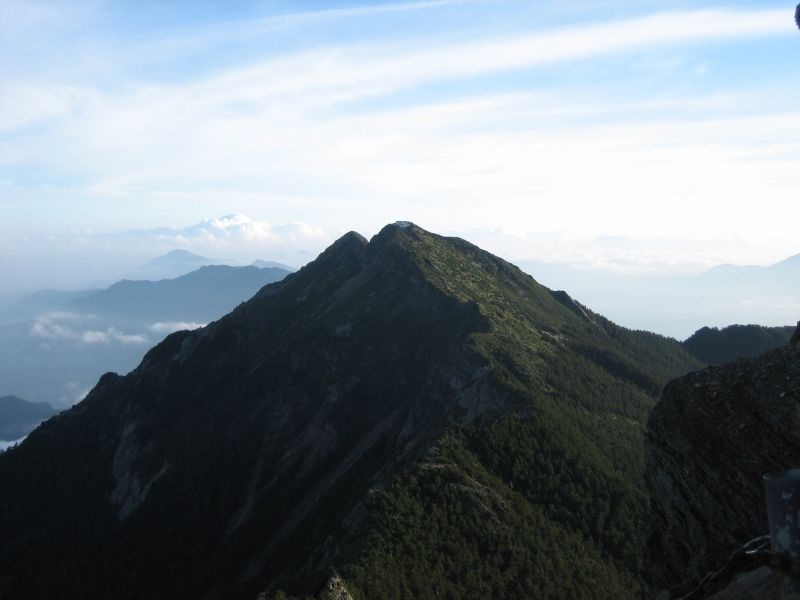
Yushan weather station on the top of Yushan's Northern Peak

The Yushan weather station is located on the north peak of Yu Shan.

It is the highest weather station in Northeast Asia and the highest building in Taiwan. It sits at an elevation of 3,858 m (12,657 ft) above sea level. A large pane of glass which provides panoramic views of the mountain was airlifted to the site by a National Airborne Service Corps helicopter.

== History ==
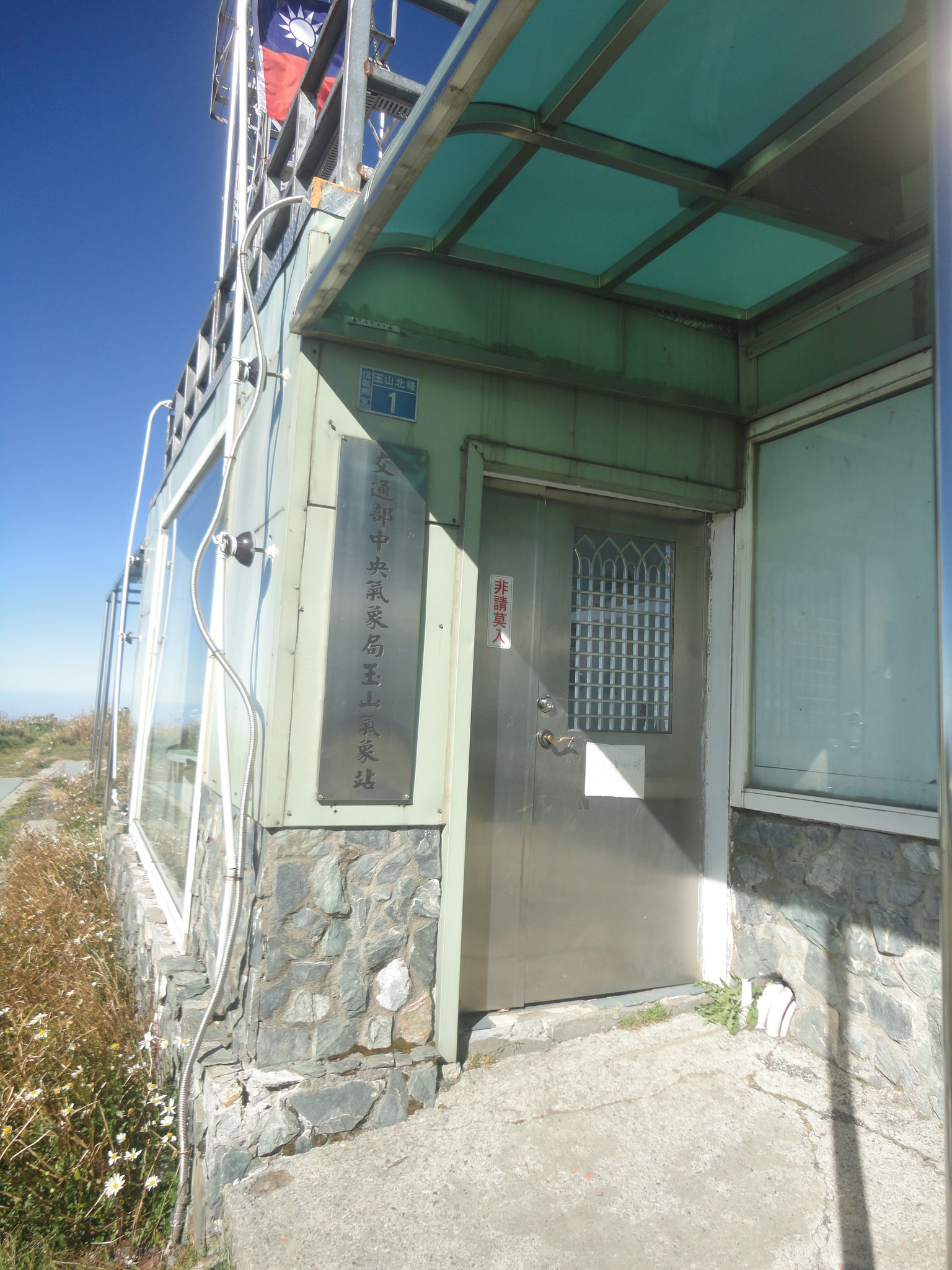
Yushan Weather Station door

The Yushan weather station was built in 1943 by the Japanese colonial authorities.

In 1989 the Central Weather Bureau worked with the Industrial Technology Research Institute to design and install a solar power system at the station. Helicopters from the Air Force were assigned to transport the system to the station with 39 trips being required to move the photovoltaic cells, batteries, and auxiliary equipment up the mountain. Operation of the solar power system began in 1990.

Before resupplying the station by helicopter became possible station assistants would have to gather wood from the surrounding gorges. In 1997 helicopters began transporting charcoal at immense cost to the station.

Following the 1999 Jiji earthquake, earthquake detection and satellite communications facilities were installed.

An expansion of the station was completed in 2000.

In 2021, workers at the station built a cafe dubbed "Cafe 3,858” out of recycled wooden crates.

== See also ==
- Lanyu Weather Station
